This is an incomplete list of Statutory Instruments of the United Kingdom in 2008.

1-100

 Insolvency Practitioners and Insolvency Services Account (Fees) (Amendment) Order 2008 (S.I. 2008/3)
 Information as to Provision of Education (England) Regulations 2008 (S.I. 2008/4)
 Immigration and Police (Passenger, Crew and Service Information) Order 2008 (S.I. 2008/5)
 Textile Products (Indications of Fibre Content) (Amendment) Regulations 2008 (S.I. 2008/6)
 Non-Domestic Rating (Demand Notices) (Wales) (Amendment) Regulations 2008 (S.I. 2008/7)
 Immigration, Asylum and Nationality Act 2006 (Data Sharing Code of Practice) Order 2008 (S.I. 2008/8)
 Transfrontier Shipment of Waste (Amendment) Regulations 2008 (S.I. 2008/9)
 Planning and Compulsory Purchase Act 2004 (Commencement No. 4 and Consequential, Transitional and Savings Provisions) (Wales) (Amendment No.1) Order 2008 (S.I. 2008/10)
 Trade Marks and Trade Marks (Fees) (Amendment) Rules 2008 (S.I. 2008/11)
 Jobseeker's Allowance (Joint Claims) Amendment Regulations 2008 (S.I. 2008/13)
 Social Security (Industrial Injuries) (Prescribed Diseases) Amendment Regulations 2008 (S.I. 2008/14)
 Textile Products (Determination of Composition) Regulations 2008 (S.I. 2008/15)
 Safeguarding Vulnerable Groups Act 2006 (Barred List Prescribed Information) Regulations 2008 (S.I. 2008/16)
 Childcare Act 2006 (Commencement No. 1) (Wales) Order 2008 (S.I. 2008/17)
 Assembly Learning Grants (European Institutions) (Wales) Regulations 2008 (S.I. 2008/18)
 Gambling Act 2005 (Advertising of Foreign Gambling) (Amendment) Regulations 2008 (S.I. 2008/19)
 Restriction of the Use of Certain Hazardous Substances in Electrical and Electronic Equipment Regulations 2008 (S.I. 2008/37)
 Armed Forces and Reserve Forces (Compensation Scheme) (Amendment) Order 2008 (S.I. 2008/39)
 Criminal Defence Service (Very High Cost Cases) Regulations 2008 (S.I. 2008/40)
 Fluorinated Greenhouse Gases Regulations 2008 (S.I. 2008/41)
 Miscellaneous Food Additives (Amendment) (England) Regulations 2008 (S.I. 2008/42)
 Hertsmere (Parish) Order 2008 (S.I. 2008/43)
 Consistent Financial Reporting (England) (Amendment) Regulations 2008 (S.I. 2008/46)
 Schools Forums (England) (Amendment) Regulations 2008 (S.I. 2008/47)
 Absent Voting (Transitional Provisions) (Scotland) Regulations 2008 (S.I. 2008/48)
 Manchester College (Incorporation) Order 2008 (S.I. 2008/49)
 Manchester College (Government) Regulations 2008 (S.I. 2008/50)
 Hill Farm Allowance Regulations 2008 (S.I. 2008/51)
 Stamp Duty Reserve Tax (Investment Exchanges and Clearing Houses) (The London Stock Exchange) Regulations 2008 (S.I. 2008/52)
 School Admission Appeals Code (Appointed Day) (England) Order 2008 (S.I. 2008/53)
 Education and Inspections Act 2006 (Commencement No. 1 and Saving Provisions) (Amendment) (England) Order 2008 (S.I. 2008/54)
 Safety of Sports Grounds (Designation) Order 2008 (S.I. 2008/55)
 Plastic Materials and Articles in Contact with Food (Lid Gaskets) (Wales) Regulations 2008 (S.I. 2008/56)
 Crime and Disorder Act 1998 (Additional Authorities) Order 2008 (S.I. 2008/78)
 Imperial College Healthcare National Health Service Trust (Trust Funds: Appointment of Trustees) Order 2008 (S.I. 2008/79)
 Common Agricultural Policy Single Payment and Support Schemes (Cross-compliance) (England) (Amendment) Regulations 2008 (S.I. 2008/80)
 European Communities (Lawyer's Practice and Services of Lawyers) (Amendment) Regulations 2008 (S.I. 2008/81)
 Police Authorities (Particular Functions and Transitional Provisions) Order 2008 (S.I. 2008/82)
 East Kent Hospitals National Health Service Trust (Transfer of Trust Property) Order 2008 (S.I. 2008/83)
 Condensed Milk and Dried Milk (England) (Amendment) Regulations 2008 (S.I. 2008/85)
 Environmental Protection (Controls on Ozone–Depleting Substances) (Amendment) Regulations 2008 (S.I. 2008/91)
 Ozone Depleting Substances (Qualifications) (Amendment) Regulations 2008 (S.I. 2008/97)
 UK Borders Act 2007 (Commencement No. 1 and Transitional Provisions) Order 2008 (S.I. 2008/99)
 William Parker School (Designation as having a Religious Character) Order 2008 (S.I. 2008/100)

101-200

 Street Works (Registers, Notices, Directions and Designations) (Wales) Regulations 2008 (S.I. 2008/101)
 Street Works (Fixed Penalty) (Wales) Regulations 2008 (S.I. 2008/102)
 Greater London Authority Act 2007 (Commencement No. 2) Order 2008 (S.I. 2008/113)
 Family Proceedings Fees (Amendment) Order 2008 (S.I. 2008/115)
 Civil Proceedings Fees (Amendment) Order 2008 (S.I. 2008/116)
 Magistrates’ Courts Fees (Amendment) Order 2008 (S.I. 2008/117)
 London Skills and Employment Board (Establishment) Regulations 2008 (S.I. 2008/118)
 London Skills and Employment Board (Specified Functions) Order 2008 (S.I. 2008/119)
 Sheep and Goats (Records, Identification and Movement) (Wales) Order 2008 (S.I. 2008/130)
 Export Control (Democratic Republic of Congo) (Amendment) Order 2008 (S.I. 2008/131)
 Immigration (Employment of Adults Subject to Immigration Control) (Maximum Penalty) Order 2008 (S.I. 2008/132)
 Social Security (Contributions) (Amendment) Regulations 2008 (S.I. 2008/133)
 British Citizenship (Designated Service) (Amendment) Order 2008 (S.I. 2008/135)
 Control of School Premises (Wales) Regulations 2008 (S.I. 2008/136)
 Condensed Milk and Dried Milk (Wales) (Amendment) Regulations 2008 (S.I. 2008/137)
 Miscellaneous Food Additives and the Sweeteners in Food (Amendment) (Wales) Regulations 2008 (S.I. 2008/138)
 Wireless Telegraphy (Licence Charges) (Amendment) Regulations 2008 (S.I. 2008/139)
 Merchant Shipping (Liner Conferences) Act 1982 (Repeal) Regulations 2008 (S.I. 2008/163)
 Stamp Duty and Stamp Duty Reserve Tax (Investment Exchanges and Clearing Houses) (Eurex Clearing AG) (Amendment) Regulations 2008 (S.I. 2008/164)
 Water Resources (Abstraction and Impounding) (Amendment) Regulations 2008 (S.I. 2008/165)
 Immigration and Nationality (Fees)(Amendment) Order 2008 (S.I. 2008/166)
 Police and Criminal Evidence Act 1984 (Codes of Practice) Order 2008 (S.I. 2008/167)
 Collaboration Between Maintained Schools (Wales) Regulations 2008 (S.I. 2008/168)
 Childcare Act 2006 (Local Authority Assessment) (Wales) Regulations 2008 (S.I. 2008/169)
 Childcare Act 2006 (Provision of Information) (Wales) Regulations 2008 (S.I. 2008/170)
 Judicial Pensions and Retirement Act 1993 (Addition of Qualifying Judicial Offices) Order 2008 (S.I. 2008/171)
 Local Government and Public Involvement in Health Act 2007 (Commencement No. 2 and Savings) Order 2008 (S.I. 2008/172)
 Bradford (Electoral Changes) Order 2008 (S.I. 2008/173)
 Halton (Parish Electoral Arrangements) Order 2008 (S.I. 2008/174)
 Hertsmere (Parish Electoral Arrangements) Order 2008 (S.I. 2008/175)
 Maidstone (Electoral Changes) Order 2008 (S.I. 2008/176)
 South Cambridgeshire (Electoral Changes) Order 2008 (S.I. 2008/177)
 Uttlesford (Electoral Changes) Order 2008 (S.I. 2008/178)
 Newark and Sherwood (Parish) Order 2008 (S.I. 2008/179)
 North Norfolk (Parishes) Order 2008 (S.I. 2008/180)
 Electricity and Gas (Carbon Emissions Reduction) Order 2008 (S.I. 2008/188)
 Income-related Benefits (Subsidy to Authorities) Amendment Order 2008 (S.I. 2008/196)
 Passenger and Goods Vehicles (Recording Equipment) (Downloading and Retention of Data) Regulations 2008 (S.I. 2008/198)
 Fire and Rescue Authorities (Improvement Plans) (Wales) Order 2008 (S.I. 2008/199)

201-300

 Copyright (Certification of Licensing Scheme for Educational Recording of Broadcasts) (Educational Recording Agency Limited) (Revocation and Amendment) Order 2008 (S.I. 2008/211)
 Independent Police Complaints Commission (Immigration and Asylum Enforcement Functions) Regulations 2008 (S.I. 2008/212)
 Firefighters’ Pension Scheme (England) (Amendment) Order 2008 (S.I. 2008/213)
 Firefighters’ Pension Scheme (Amendment) (England) Order 2008 (S.I. 2008/214)
 Education (School Teachers' Qualifications) (Amendment) (Wales) Regulations 2008 (S.I. 2008/215)
 Rating Lists (Valuation Date) (England) Order 2008 (S.I. 2008/216)
 Occupational Pension Schemes (Levy Ceiling - Earnings Percentage Increase) Order 2008 (S.I. 2008/217)
 Immigration and Nationality (Cost Recovery Fees)(Amendment) Regulations 2008 (S.I. 2008/218)
 Serious Crime Act 2007 (Commencement No.1) Order 2008 (S.I. 2008/219)
 Local Government (Politically Restricted Posts) (Wales) Regulations 2008 (S.I. 2008/220)
 Charity Tribunal Rules 2008 (S.I. 2008/221)
 Legal Services Act 2007 (Commencement No.1 and Transitory Provisions) Order 2008 (S.I. 2008/222)
 Social Security (National Insurance Numbers) Amendment Regulations 2008 (S.I. 2008/223)
 National Health Service (Functions of Strategic Health Authorities and Primary Care Trusts and Administration Arrangements) (England) (Amendment) Regulations 2008 (S.I. 2008/224)
 Petroleum Licensing (Production) (Seaward Areas) Regulations 2008 (S.I. 2008/225)
 Road Traffic (Permitted Parking Area and Special Parking Area) (County Borough of Wrexham) Order 2008 (S.I. 2008/226)
 Local Authorities (Alteration of Requisite Calculations) (England) Regulations 2008 (S.I. 2008/227)
 School Finance (England) Regulations 2008 (S.I. 2008/228)
 Armed Forces (Gurkha Pensions) (Amendment) Order 2008 (S.I. 2008/229)
 Port of Weston Harbour Revision Order 2008 (S.I. 2008/230)
 A556 (M) Motorway (M6 to M56 Link) and Connecting Roads Scheme 1996 (Revocation) Order 2008 (S.I. 2008/231)
 A556 (M) Motorway (M6 to M56 Link) and Supplementary Connecting Roads Scheme 1996 (Revocation) Order 2008 (S.I. 2008/232)
 A556 Trunk Road (Church Farm-Turnpike Wood, Over Tabley) Order 1996 (Revocation) Order 2008 (S.I. 2008/233)
 A556 Trunk Road (Turnpike Wood, Over Tabley-A56 Bowdon Roundabout) (Detrunking) Order 1996 (Revocation) Order 2008 (S.I. 2008/234)
 Education (Student Support) (Amendment) Regulations 2008 (S.I. 2008/235)
 Wireless Telegraphy (Exemption) (Amendment) Regulations 2008 (S.I. 2008/236)
 Wireless Telegraphy (Automotive Short Range Radar) (Exemption) (No. 2) (Amendment) Regulations 2008 (S.I. 2008/237)
 Local Government Pension Scheme (Transitional Provisions) Regulations 2008 (S.I. 2008/238)
 Local Government Pension Scheme (Administration) Regulations 2008 (S.I. 2008/239)
 Personal Injuries (NHS Charges) (Amounts) Amendment Regulations 2008 (S.I. 2008/252)
 Agricultural Holdings (Units of Production) (Wales) Order 2008 (S.I. 2008/253)
 Rent Repayment Orders (Supplementary Provisions) (Wales) Regulations 2008 (S.I. 2008/254)
 Payments into the Olympic Lottery Distribution Fund etc. Order 2008 S.I. 2008/255)
 Police (Promotion) (Amendment) Regulations 2008 (S.I. 2008/273)
 Berwick-upon-Tweed (Parishes) Order 2008 (S.I. 2008/290)
 Controlled Drugs (Drug Precursors) (Intra-Community Trade) Regulations 2008 (S.I. 2008/295)
 Controlled Drugs (Drug Precursors) (Community External Trade) Regulations 2008 (S.I. 2008/296)
 European Communities (Definition of Treaties) (Agreement on Enlargement of the European Economic Area) Order 2008 (S.I. 2008/297)
 Proceeds of Crime Act 2002 (Investigations in different parts of the United Kingdom) (Amendment) Order 2008 (S.I. 2008/298)
 Visiting Forces (Designation) Order 2008 (S.I. 2008/299)
 Judicial Committee (General Appellate Jurisdiction) Rules (Amendment) Order 2008 (S.I. 2008/300)

301-400

 European Communities (Designation) Order 2008 (S.I. 2008/301)
 Proceeds of Crime Act 2002 (External Requests and Orders) (Amendment) Order 2008 (S.I. 2008/302)
 High Peak (Parishes) Order 2008 (S.I. 2008/303)
 Cotswold (Parishes) Order 2008 (S.I. 2008/304)
 Representation of the People (Scotland) (Amendment) Regulations 2008 (S.I. 2008/305)
 Serious Organised Crime and Police Act 2005 (Commencement No. 12) Order 2008 (S.I. 2008/306)
 Scottish Parliament (Elections etc.) (Amendment) Order 2008 (S.I. 2008/307)
 Countryside and Rights of Way Act 2000 (Commencement No. 15) Order 2008 (S.I. 2008/308)
 UK Borders Act 2007 (Commencement No. 2 and Transitional Provisions) Order 2008 (S.I. 2008/309)
 Immigration, Asylum and Nationality Act 2006 (Commencement No. 8 and Transitional and Saving Provisions) Order 2008 (S.I. 2008/310)
 Police and Justice Act 2006 (Commencement No. 7 and Savings Provision) Order 2008 (S.I. 2008/311)
 Policing Plan Regulations 2008 (S.I. 2008/312)
 Further Education and Training Act 2007 (Commencement No. 1) (England) Order 2008 (S.I. 2008/313)
 Site Waste Management Plans Regulations 2008 (S.I. 2008/314)
 Council Tax (Valuations, Alteration of Lists and Appeals) (England) Regulations 2008 (S.I. 2008/315)
 Council Tax (Electronic Communications) (England) Order 2008 (S.I. 2008/316)
 Local Government and Public Involvement in Health Act 2007 (Commencement No. 3, Transitional and Saving Provisions and Commencement No. 2 (Amendment)) Order 2008 (S.I. 2008/337)
 A4 Trunk Road (Bath to Bristol) (Detrunking) Order 2008 (S.I. 2008/342)
 Regulated Covered Bonds Regulations 2008 (S.I. 2008/346)
 Education (School Performance Information) (England) (Amendment) Regulations 2008 (S.I. 2008/364)
 Housing (Right to Buy) (Priority of Charges) (Wales) Order 2008 (S.I. 2008/371)
 Oxford (Parishes) Order 2008 (S.I. 2008/372)
 Companies (Revision of Defective Accounts and Reports) Regulations 2008 (S.I. 2008/373)
 Companies (Summary Financial Statement) Regulations 2008 (S.I. 2008/374)
 Environmental Noise (England) (Amendment) Regulations 2008 (S.I. 2008/375)
 Isle of Wight (Parishes) Order 2008 (S.I. 2008/376)
 Education (Budget Statements) (England) Regulations 2008 (S.I. 2008/377)
 Northern Ireland Arms Decommissioning Act 1997 (Amnesty Period) Order 2008 (S.I. 2008/378)
 Finance Act 2007 (Schedule 9) Order 2008 (S.I. 2008/379)
 Insurance Business Transfer Schemes (Amendment of the Corporation Tax Acts) Order 2008 (S.I. 2008/381)
 Community Investment Tax Relief (Accreditation of Community Development Finance Institutions) (Amendment) Regulations 2008 (S.I. 2008/383)
 Non-Domestic Rating (Unoccupied Property) (England) Regulations 2008 (S.I. 2008/386)
 Council Tax and Non-Domestic Rating (Demand Notices) (England) (Amendment) Regulations 2008 (S.I. 2008/387)
 Companies Act 2006 (Amendment) (Accounts and Reports) Regulations 2008 (S.I. 2008/393)
 Corporate Manslaughter and Corporate Homicide Act 2007 (Amendment of Schedule 1) Order 2008 (S.I. 2008/396)

401-500

 Corporate Manslaughter and Corporate Homicide Act 2007 (Commencement No.1) Order 2008 (S.I. 2008/401)
 Serious Crime Act 2007 (Disclosure of Information by Revenue and Customs) Order 2008 (S.I. 2008/403)
 Healthy Start Scheme and Welfare Food (Amendment) Regulations 2008 (S.I. 2008/408)
 Small Companies and Groups (Accounts and Directors’ Report) Regulations 2008 (S.I. 2008/409)
 Large and Medium-sized Companies and Groups (Accounts and Reports) Regulations 2008 (S.I. 2008/410)
 Welfare Reform Act 2007 (Commencement No. 5) Order 2008 (S.I. 2008/411)
 Northumberland, Tyne and Wear National Health Service Trust (Transfer of Trust Property) Order 2008 (S.I. 2008/412)
 Producer Responsibility Obligations (Packaging Waste) (Amendment) Regulations 2008 (S.I. 2008/413)
 Local Authorities (Capital Finance and Accounting) (England) (Amendment) Regulations 2008 (S.I. 2008/414)
 Surrey Primary Care Trust (Transfer of Trust Property) Order 2008 (S.I. 2008/415)
 Dorset Primary Care Trust (Transfer of Trust Property) Order 2008 (S.I. 2008/416)
 Concessionary Bus Travel (Permits)(England) Regulations 2008 (S.I. 2008/417)
 Motor Cars (Driving Instruction) (Amendment) Regulations 2008 (S.I. 2008/419)
 Welsh Levy Board Order 2008 (S.I. 2008/420)
 Leeds (Parish) Order 2008 (S.I. 2008/421)
 Sevenoaks (Parishes) Order 2008 (S.I. 2008/422)
 District of South Lakeland (Electoral Changes) Order 2008 (S.I. 2008/423)
 Borough of Welwyn Hatfield (Electoral Changes) Order 2008 (S.I. 2008/424)
 Borough of Basingstoke and Deane (Electoral Changes) Order 2008 (S.I. 2008/425)
 Borough of Barrow-in-Furness (Electoral Changes) Order 2008 (S.I. 2008/427)
 Local Government (Non-Domestic Rating) (Consequential Amendments) (England) Order 2008 (S.I. 2008/428)
 Central Rating List (England) (Amendment) Regulations 2008 (S.I. 2008/429)
 Cornwall Partnership National Health Service Trust (Transfer of Trust Property) Order 2008 (S.I. 2008/430)
 Wildlife and Countryside Act 1981 (Variation of Schedule 5) (England) Order 2008 (S.I. 2008/431)
 Northern Rock plc Transfer Order 2008 (S.I. 2008/432)
 Dairy Produce Quotas (General Provisions) (Amendment) Regulations 2008 (S.I. 2008/438)
 Dairy Produce Quotas (Amendment) Regulations 2008 (S.I. 2008/439)
 North Bristol National Health Service Trust (Transfer of Trust Property) Order 2008 (S.I. 2008/440)
 Social Security (Claims and Payments) Amendment Regulations 2008 (S.I. 2008/441)
 Public Rights of Way (Combined Orders) (England) Regulations 2008 (S.I. 2008/442)
 Meat (Official Controls Charges) (England) Regulations 2008 (S.I. 2008/447)
 Fire and Rescue Authorities (Best Value Performance Indicators) (Wales) Order 2008 (S.I. 2008/450)
 Local Government and Public Involvement in Health Act 2007 (Commencement No. 4) Order 2008 (S.I. 2008/461)
 European Qualifications (Health and Social Care Professions) (Amendment) Regulations 2008 (S.I. 2008/462)
 Social Security (Local Authority Investigations and Prosecutions) Regulations 2008 (S.I. 2008/463)
 Prescription Only Medicines (Human Use) Amendment Order 2008 (S.I. 2008/464)
 Products of Animal Origin (Disease Control) (England) Regulations 2008 (S.I. 2008/465)
 Street Works (Fixed Penalty) (Wales) (Amendment) Regulations 2008 (S.I. 2008/466)
 Gambling (Inviting Competing Applications for Large and Small Casino Premises Licences) Regulations 2008 (S.I. 2008/469)
 Safeguarding Vulnerable Groups Act 2006 (Transitional Provisions) Order 2008 (S.I. 2008/473)
 Safeguarding Vulnerable Groups Act 2006 (Barring Procedure) Regulations 2008 (S.I. 2008/474)
 Local Authorities (Alteration of Requisite Calculations) (Wales) Regulations 2008 (S.I. 2008/476)
 Companies (Disclosure of Auditor Remuneration and Liability Limitation Agreements) Regulations 2008 (S.I. 2008/489)
 Wiltshire (Structural Change) Order 2008 (S.I. 2008/490)
 Cornwall (Structural Change) Order 2008 (S.I. 2008/491)
 Shropshire (Structural Change) Order 2008 (S.I. 2008/492)
 County Durham (Structural Change) Order 2008 (S.I. 2008/493)
 Northumberland (Structural Change) Order 2008 (S.I. 2008/494)
 Companies (Trading Disclosures) Regulations 2008 (S.I. 2008/495)
 Statutory Auditors (Delegation of Functions etc.) Order 2008 (S.I. 2008/496)
 Companies (Late Filing Penalties) and Limited Liability Partnerships (Filing Periods and Late Filing Penalties) Regulations 2008 (S.I. 2008/497)
 Social Security Pensions (Home Responsibilities) Amendment Regulations 2008 (S.I. 2008/498)
 Statutory Auditors and Third Country Auditors (Amendment) Regulations 2008 (S.I. 2008/499)

501-600

 Oxford (Parish Electoral Arrangements) Order 2008 (S.I. 2008/501)
 Town and Country Planning (General Permitted Development) (Amendment) (Wales) Order 2008 (S.I. 2008/502)
 Local Government (Best Value Performance Indicators) (Wales) Order 2008 (S.I. 2008/503)
 Offender Management Act 2007 (Commencement No. 2 and Transitional Provision) Order 2008 (S.I. 2008/504)
 Immigration Services Commissioner (Designated Professional Body) (Fees) Order 2008 (S.I. 2008/505)
 Vehicle Drivers (Certificates of Professional Competence) (Amendment) Regulations 2008 (S.I. 2008/506)
 Greater London Authority Elections (Election Addresses) (Amendment) Order 2008 (S.I. 2008/507)
 Motor Vehicles (Driving Licences) (Amendment) Regulations 2008 (S.I. 2008/508)
 Education (Assisted Places) (Amendment) (Wales) Regulations 2008 (S.I. 2008/509)
 Education (Assisted Places) (Incidental Expenses) (Amendment) (Wales) Regulations 2008 (S.I. 2008/510)
 Car Fuel Benefit Order 2008 (S.I. 2008/511)
 Smoke Control Areas (Authorised Fuels) (England) Regulations 2008 (S.I. 2008/514)
 Smoke Control Areas (Exempted Fireplaces) (England) Order 2008 (S.I. 2008/515)
 Local Authorities (Functions and Responsibilities) (England) (Amendment) Regulations 2008 (S.I. 2008/516)
 Meat Products (England) (Amendment) Regulations 2008 (S.I. 2008/517)
 Aerodromes (Designation) (Chargeable Air Services) (Amendment) Order 2008 (S.I. 2008/518)
 Health and Social Care Information Centre (Transfer of Staff, Property and Liabilities) Order 2008 (S.I. 2008/519)
 Radioactive Contaminated Land (Modification of Enactments) (England) (Amendment) Regulations 2008 (S.I. 2008/520)
 Radioactive Contaminated Land (Modification of Enactments) (Wales) (Amendment) Regulations 2008 (S.I. 2008/521)
 Proceeds of Crime Act 2002 (Legal Expenses in Civil Recovery Proceedings) (Amendment) Regulations 2008 (S.I. 2008/523)
 Control of Salmonella in Poultry (Wales) Order 2008 (S.I. 2008/524)
 Blood Safety and Quality (Fees Amendment) Regulations 2008 (S.I. 2008/525)
 Local Government and Public Involvement in Health Act 2007 Consequential Provisions Order 2008 (S.I. 2008/526)
 Charities Act 2006 (Charitable Companies Audit and Group Accounts Provisions) Order 2008 (S.I. 2008/527)
 Local Involvement Networks Regulations 2008 (S.I. 2008/528)
 Education (Student Support) Regulations 2008 (S.I. 2008/529)
 Medical Devices (Fees Amendments) Regulations 2008 (S.I. 2008/530)
 Public Interest Disclosure (Prescribed Persons) (Amendment) Order 2008 (S.I. 2008/531)
 Education (Pupil Exclusions and Appeals) (Pupil Referral Units) (England) Regulations 2008 (S.I. 2008/532)
 Housing (Right to Buy) (Service Charges) (Amendment) (England) Order 2008 (S.I. 2008/533)
 Industrial Training Levy (Construction Industry Training Board) Order 2008 (S.I. 2008/534)
 Industrial Training Levy (Engineering Construction Industry Training Board) Order 2008 (S.I. 2008/535)
 Child Support (Miscellaneous Amendments) Regulations 2008 (S.I. 2008/536)
 Courts and Legal Services Act 1990 (Modification of Power to Make Rules about Licensed Conveyancers) Order 2008 (S.I. 2008/537)
 Assembly Learning Grant (Further Education) Regulations 2008 (S.I. 2008/538)
 Immigration, Asylum and Nationality Act 2006 (Duty to Share Information and Disclosure of Information for Security Purposes) Order 2008 (S.I. 2008/539)
 Street Works (Registers, Notices, Directions and Designations) (Wales) (No. 2) Regulations 2008 (S.I. 2008/540)
 Teachers’ Pensions (Miscellaneous Amendments) Regulations 2008 (S.I. 2008/541)
 Police Act 1997 (Criminal Records) (Disclosure) Regulations (Northern Ireland) 2008 (S.I. 2008/542)
 Honey (Wales) (Amendment) Regulations 2008 (S.I. 2008/543)
 Immigration and Nationality (Fees) (Amendment) Regulations 2008 (S.I. 2008/544)
 Education (Student Loans) (Repayment) (Amendment) Regulations 2008 (S.I. 2008/546)
 National Health Service (Dental Charges) Amendment Regulations 2008 (S.I. 2008/547)
 Medicines for Human Use (Prohibition) (Senecio and Miscellaneous Amendments) Order 2008 (S.I. 2008/548)
 Pendle (Parishes) Order 2008 (S.I. 2008/549)
 Town and Country Planning (General Development Procedure) (Amendment) (England) Order 2008 (S.I. 2008/550)
 Planning (Listed Buildings and Conservation Areas) (Amendment) (England) Regulations 2008 (S.I. 2008/551)
 Medicines (Products for Human Use-Fees) Regulations 2008 (S.I. 2008/552)
 National Health Service (Optical Charges and Payments) Amendment Regulations 2008 (S.I. 2008/553)
 Postgraduate Medical Education and Training Board (Fees) Rules Order 2008 (S.I. 2008/554)
 Control of School Premises (Wales) (Amendment) Regulations 2008 (S.I. 2008/555)
 Value Added Tax (Amendment) Regulations 2008 (S.I. 2008/556)
 Statistics of Trade (Customs and Excise) (Amendment) Regulations 2008 (S.I. 2008/557)
 NHS Professionals Special Health Authority (Establishment and Constitution) (Amendment) Order 2008 (S.I. 2008/558)
 Prevention of Terrorism Act 2005 (Continuance in force of sections 1 to 9) Order 2008 (S.I. 2008/559)
 Seed Potatoes (England) (Amendment) Regulations 2008 (S.I. 2008/560)
 Finance Act 2007 Section 46 (Commencement) Order 2008 (S.I. 2008/561)
 Income Tax (Purchased Life Annuities) Regulations 2008 (S.I. 2008/562)
 Defence Support Group Trading Fund Order 2008 (S.I. 2008/563)
 Insurance Accounts Directive (Miscellaneous Insurance Undertakings) Regulations 2008 (S.I. 2008/565)
 Tyne and Wear Fire and Rescue Authority (Increase in Number of Members) Order 2008 (S.I. 2008/566)
 Bank Accounts Directive (Miscellaneous Banks) Regulations 2008 (S.I. 2008/567)
 Finance Act 2007, Schedule 24 (Commencement and Transitional Provisions) Order 2008 (S.I. 2008/568)
 Partnerships (Accounts) Regulations 2008 (S.I. 2008/569)
 Supply of Information (Register of Deaths) (England and Wales) Order 2008 (S.I. 2008/570)
 National Health Service (Charges for Drugs and Appliances) and (Travel Expenses and Remission of Charges) Amendment Regulations 2008 (S.I. 2008/571)
 Home Information Pack (Amendment) Regulations 2008 (S.I. 2008/572)
 Employment Equality (Age) Regulations 2006 (Amendment) Regulations 2008 (S.I. 2008/573)
 Serious Organised Crime and Police Act 2005 and Serious Crime Act 2007 (Consequential and Supplementary Amendments to Secondary Legislation) Order 2008 (S.I. 2008/574)
 Assets Recovery Agency (Abolition) Order 2008 (S.I. 2008/575)
 Agriculture and Horticulture Development Board Order 2008 (S.I. 2008/576)
 National Health Service (Optical Charges and Payments) and (General Ophthalmic Services) (Amendment) (Wales) Regulations 2008 (S.I. 2008/577)
 Social Security (Contributions) (Re-rating) Order 2008 (S.I. 2008/579)
 Town and Country Planning (Mayor of London) Order 2008 (S.I. 2008/580)
 Guaranteed Minimum Pensions Increase Order 2008 (S.I. 2008/581)
 Greater London Authority Act 2007 (Commencement No. 3) Order 2008 (S.I. 2008/582)
 Companies (Cross-Border Mergers) (Amendment) Regulations 2008 (S.I. 2008/583)
 Powys (Communities) Order 2008 (S.I. 2008/584)
 A456 Trunk Road (Detrunking) Order 2008 (S.I. 2008/585)
 Housing Benefit (Local Housing Allowance, Information Sharing and Miscellaneous) Amendment Regulations 2008 (S.I. 2008/586)
 Rent Officers (Housing Benefit Functions) Amendment Order 2008 (S.I. 2008/587)
 Local Authorities (Capital Finance and Accounting) (Wales) (Amendment) Regulations 2008 (S.I. 2008/588)
 Street Works (Inspection Fees) (England) (Amendment) Regulations 2008 (S.I. 2008/589)
 FCO Services Trading Fund Order 2008 (S.I. 2008/590)
 Local Government and Public Involvement in Health Act 2007 (Commencement) (Wales) Order 2008 (S.I. 2008/591)
 Personal Injuries (Civilians) (Amendment) Scheme 2008 (S.I. 2008/592)
 National Assistance (Sums for Personal Requirements and Assessment of Resources) Amendment (England) Regulations 2008 (S.I. 2008/593)
 Water Supply and Sewerage Services (Customer Service Standards) Regulations 2008 (S.I. 2008/594)
 Town and Country Planning (Determination of Appeals by Appointed Persons) (Prescribed Classes) (Amendment) (England) Regulations 2008 (S.I. 2008/595)
 Prison (Amendment) Rules 2008 (S.I. 2008/597)
 Offender Management Act 2007 (Establishment of Probation Trusts) Order 2008 (S.I. 2008/598)
 Young Offender Institution (Amendment) Rules 2008 (S.I. 2008/599)
 Street Works (Inspection Fees) (Wales) (Amendment) Regulations 2008 (S.I. 2008/600)

601-700

 Meat (Official Controls Charges) (Wales) Regulations 2008 (S.I. 2008/601)
 Kettering (Parish) Order 2008 (S.I. 2008/602)
 St Helens (Parish) Order 2008 (S.I. 2008/603)
 Tax Credits (Miscellaneous Amendments) Regulations 2008 (S.I. 2008/604)
 Inheritance Tax (Delivery of Accounts) (Excepted Transfers and Excepted Terminations) Regulations 2008 (S.I. 2008/605)
 Inheritance Tax (Delivery of Accounts) (Excepted Settlements) Regulations 2008 (S.I. 2008/606)
 Social Security (Contributions) (Amendment No. 2) Regulations 2008 (S.I. 2008/607)
 Civil Enforcement of Parking Contraventions (Representations and Appeals) (Wales) Regulations 2008 (S.I. 2008/608)
 Civil Enforcement of Parking Contraventions (Penalty Charge Notices, Enforcement and Adjudication) (Wales) Regulations 2008 (S.I. 2008/609)
 Electoral Administration Act 2006 (Commencement No. 6) Order 2008 (S.I. 2008/610)
 Public Trustee (Fees) Order 2008 (S.I. 2008/611)
 Removal and Disposal of Vehicles (Amendment) (Wales) Regulations 2008 (S.I. 2008/612)
 Civil Enforcement of Parking Contraventions (Guidelines on Levels of Charges) (Wales) Order 2008 (S.I. 2008/613)
 Civil Enforcement of Parking Contraventions (General Provisions) (Wales) Regulations 2008 (S.I. 2008/614)
 Civil Enforcement of Parking Contraventions (Representations and Appeals) Removed Vehicles (Wales) Regulations 2008 (S.I. 2008/615)
 Civil Enforcement Officers (Wearing of Uniforms) (Wales) Regulations 2008 (S.I. 2008/616)
 Police and Justice Act 2006 (Commencement No. 1, Transitional and Saving Provisions) (Amendment) Order 2008 (S.I. 2008/617)
 Brucellosis (England) (Amendment) Order 2008 (S.I. 2008/618)
 Police and Justice Act 2006 (Supplementary and Transitional Provisions) (Amendment) Order 2008 (S.I. 2008/619)
 Civil Enforcement of Parking Contraventions (Approved Devices) (Wales) Order 2008 (S.I. 2008/620)
 Discharge of Fines by Unpaid Work (Pilot Schemes) (Amendment) Order 2008 (S.I. 2008/621)
 Rice Products from the United States of America (Restriction on First Placing on the Market) (England) Regulations 2008 (S.I. 2008/622)
 Companies (Defective Accounts and Directors’ Reports) (Authorised Person) and Supervision of Accounts and Reports (Prescribed Body) Order 2008 (S.I. 2008/623)
 Occupational Pension Schemes (Non-European Schemes Exemption) Regulations 2008 (S.I. 2008/624)
 Local Government (Parishes and Parish Councils) (England) Regulations 2008 (S.I. 2008/625)
 Local Government Finance (New Parishes) (England) Regulations 2008 (S.I. 2008/626)
 Pensions Act 2004 (Commencement No. 11) Order 2008 (S.I. 2008/627)
 Defence Aviation Repair Agency Trading Fund (Amendment) Order 2008 (S.I. 2008/628)
 Charities (Accounts and Reports) Regulations 2008 (S.I. 2008/629)
 Police Authority Regulations 2008 (S.I. 2008/630)
 Metropolitan Police Authority Regulations 2008 (S.I. 2008/631)
 Social Security Benefits Up-rating Order 2008 (S.I. 2008/632)
 Penwith College, Penzance (Dissolution) Order 2008 (S.I. 2008/633)
 Cheshire (Structural Changes) Order 2008 (S.I. 2008/634)
 Criminal Procedure and Investigations Act 1996 (Application to the Armed Forces) Order 2008 (S.I. 2008/635)
 Social Security (Contributions) (Amendment No. 3) Regulations 2008 (S.I. 2008/636)
 Discretionary Financial Assistance (Amendment) Regulations 2008 (S.I. 2008/637)
 Gangmasters (Licensing Conditions) (No. 2) (Amendment) Rules 2008 (S.I. 2008/638)
 Export Control (Security and Para-military Goods) Order 2008 (S.I. 2008/639)
 Fostering Services (Amendment) Regulations 2008 (S.I. 2008/640)
 Disability Discrimination (Public Authorities) (Statutory Duties) (Amendment) Regulations 2008 (S.I. 2008/641)
 Road Vehicles (Registration and Licensing) (Amendment) Regulations 2008 (S.I. 2008/642)
 Communications (Television Licensing) (Amendment) Regulations 2008 (S.I. 2008/643)
 Plant Health (Forestry) (Amendment) Order 2008 (S.I. 2008/644)
 Consumer Credit (Exempt Agreements) (Amendment) Order 2008 (S.I. 2008/645)
 Farriers’ Qualifications (European Recognition) Regulations 2008 (S.I. 2008/646)
 Energy Performance of Buildings (Certificates and Inspections) (England and Wales) (Amendment) Regulations 2008 (S.I. 2008/647)
 Criminal Procedure and Investigations Act 1969 (Code of Practice) (Armed Forces) Order 2008 (S.I. 2008/648)
 Occupational Pension Schemes (Internal Dispute Resolution Procedures Consequential and Miscellaneous Amendments) Regulations 2008 (S.I. 2008/649)
 Pneumoconiosis etc. (Workers’ Compensation) (Payment of Claims) (Amendment) Regulations 2008 (S.I. 2008/650)
 Accounting Standards (Prescribed Body) Regulations 2008 (S.I. 2008/651)
 Diseases of Animals (Approved Disinfectants) (Fees) (England) Order 2008 (S.I. 2008/652)
 National Health Service Pension Scheme Regulations 2008 (S.I. 2008/653)
 National Health Service Pension Scheme (Amendment) Regulations 2008 (S.I. 2008/654)
 National Health Service Pension Scheme (Additional Voluntary Contributions) and National Health Service (Injury Benefits and Compensation for Premature Retirement) Amendment Regulations 2008 (S.I. 2008/655)
 Sex Discrimination Act 1975 (Amendment) Regulations 2008 (S.I. 2008/656)
 Education (Induction Arrangements for School Teachers) (England) Regulations 2008 (S.I. 2008/657)
 Community Legal Service (Financial) (Amendment) Regulations 2008 (S.I. 2008/658)
 Police Authorities (Best Value) Performance Indicators Order 2008 (S.I. 2008/659)
 National Health Service (Optical Charges and Payments) (Amendment) (Wales) Regulations 2008 (S.I. 2008/660)
 Occupational and Personal Pension Schemes (General Levy) (Amendment) Regulations 2008 (S.I. 2008/661)
 Insolvency (Scotland) Amendment Rules 2008 (S.I. 2008/662)
 Environmental Offences (Fixed Penalties) (Miscellaneous Provisions) (Wales) Regulations 2008 (S.I. 2008/663)
 Pension Protection Fund (Prescribed Payments) Regulations 2008 (S.I. 2008/664)
 Pesticides (Maximum Residue Levels in Crops, Food and Feeding Stuffs) (England and Wales) (Amendment) Regulations 2008 (S.I. 2008/665)
 Community Legal Service (Funding) (Counsel in Family Proceedings) (Amendment) Order 2008 (S.I. 2008/666)
 Social Security Benefits Up-rating Regulations 2008 (S.I. 2008/667)
 Consumer Credit Appeals Tribunal Rules 2008 (S.I. 2008/668)
 Rules of the Air (Amendment) Regulations 2008 (S.I. 2008/669)
 Insolvency (Amendment) Regulations 2008 (S.I. 2008/670)
 Building (Amendment) Regulations 2008 (S.I. 2008/671)
 Insolvency Practitioners and Insolvency Services Account (Fees) (Amendment) (No. 2) Order 2008 (S.I. 2008/672)
 Income Tax (Indexation) Order 2008 (S.I. 2008/673)
 Companies Act 2006 (Commencement No. 6, Saving and Commencement Nos. 3 and 5 (Amendment)) Order 2008 (S.I. 2008/674)
 Town and Country Planning (General Permitted Development) (Amendment) (England) Order 2008 (S.I. 2008/675)
 Consular Fees Order 2008 (S.I. 2008/676)
 Copyright and Performances (Application to Other Countries) Order 2008 (S.I. 2008/677)
 Transfer of Functions (Registration) Order 2008 (S.I. 2008/678)
 Naval, Military and Air Forces Etc. (Disablement and Death) Service Pensions (Amendment) Order 2008 (S.I. 2008/679)
 Immigration (Isle of Man) Order 2008 (S.I. 2008/680)
 Inspectors of Education, Children's Services and Skills Order 2008 (S.I. 2880/681)
 Financial Services and Markets Act 2000 (Exemption) (Amendment) Order 2008 (S.I. 2008/682)
 National Health Service (Pharmaceutical Services) (Amendment) Regulations 2008 (S.I. 2008/683)
 Immigration (Notices) (Amendment) Regulations 2008 (S.I. 2008/684)
 Dairy Produce Quotas (Wales) (Amendment) Regulations 2008 (S.I. 2008/685)
 Wireless Telegraphy (Licence Award) Regulations 2008 (S.I. 2008/686)
 Wireless Telegraphy (Limitation of Number of Spectrum Access Licences) Order 2008 (S.I. 2008/687)
 Wireless Telegraphy (Spectrum Trading) (Amendment) Regulations 2008 (S.I. 2008/688)
 Wireless Telegraphy (Register) (Amendment) Regulations 2008 (S.I. 2008/689)
 Companies (Mergers and Divisions of Public Companies) (Amendment) Regulations 2008 (S.I. 2008/690)
 Tope (Prohibition of Fishing) Order 2008 (S.I. 2008/691)
 Police Act 1997 (Commencement No. 11) Order 2008 (S.I. 2008/692)
 S4C (Investment Activities) Approval Order 2008 (S.I. 2008/693)
 Criminal Justice Act 2003 (Commencement No. 19) Order 2008 (S.I. 2008/694)
 Income-related Benefits (Subsidy to Authorities) Amendment (No. 2) Order 2008 (S.I. 2008/695)
 Gas (Standards of Performance) (Amendment) Regulations 2008 (S.I. 2008/696)
 Serious Organised Crime and Police Act 2005 (Commencement No. 12) Order 2008 (S.I. 2008/697)
 Social Security (Miscellaneous Amendments) Regulations 2008 (S.I. 2008/698)
 Social Security (Industrial Injuries) (Dependency) (Permitted Earnings Limits) Order 2008 (S.I. 2008/699)
 Supply of Information (Register of Deaths) (Northern Ireland) Order 2008 (S.I. 2008/700)

701-800

 Greater London Authority (Mayor of London Appointments) Order 2008 (S.I. 2008/701)
 Plant Health (Fees) (Forestry) (Amendment) Regulations 2008 (S.I. 2008/702)
 Social Security (Contributions) (Re-rating) Consequential Amendment Regulations 2008 (S.I. 2008/703)
 Individual Savings Account (Amendment) Regulations 2008 (S.I. 2008/704)
 Authorised Investment Funds (Tax) (Amendment) Regulations 2008 (S.I. 2008/705)
 Income Tax (Limits for Enterprise Management Incentives) Order 2008 (S.I. 2008/706)
 Value Added Tax (Increase of Registration Limits) Order 2008 (S.I. 2008/707)
 Capital Gains Tax (Annual Exempt Amount) Order 2008 (S.I. 2008/708)
 Income Tax (Indexation) (No. 2) Order 2008 (S.I. 2008/709)
 Stamp Duty Land Tax (Open-ended Investment Companies) Regulations 2008 (S.I. 2008/710)
 Pensions Increase (Review) Order 2008 (S.I. 2008/711)
 Hywel Dda National Health Service Trust (Establishment) Order 2008 (S.I. 2008/712)
 Meat Products (Wales) (Amendment) Regulations 2008 (S.I. 2008/713)
 Insolvency Proceedings (Fees) (Amendment) Order 2008 (S.I. 2008/714)
 Gender Recognition (Application Fees) (Amendment) Order 2008 (S.I. 2008/715)
 Abertawe Bro Morgannwg University National Health Service Trust (Establishment) Order 2008 (S.I. 2008/716)
 Cwm Taf National Health Service Trust (Establishment) Order 2008 (S.I. 2008/717)
 Northern Rock plc Compensation Scheme Order 2008 (S.I. 2008/718)
 Companies (Reduction of Capital) (Creditor Protection) Regulations 2008 (S.I. 2008/719)
 Registered Pension Schemes (Provision of Information) (Amendment) Regulations 2008 (S.I. 2008/720)
 Workmen's Compensation (Supplementation) (Amendment) Scheme 2008 (S.I. 2008/721)
 Value Added Tax (Consideration for Fuel Provided for Private Use) Order 2008 (S.I. 2008/722)
 Criminal Defence Service (Financial Eligibility) (Amendment) Regulations 2008 (S.I. 2008/723)
 Greater London Authority (Limitation of Salaries) (Amendment) Order 2008 (S.I. 2008/724)
 Criminal Defence Service (General) (No. 2) (Amendment) Regulations 2008 (S.I. 2008/725)
 Social Security Pensions (Low Earnings Threshold) Order 2008 (S.I. 2008/726)
 National Health Service Trusts (Originating Capital) Order 2008 (S.I. 2008/727)
 European Grouping of Territorial Cooperation (Amendment) Regulations 2008 (S.I. 2008/728)
 Companies (Authorised Minimum) Regulations 2008 (S.I. 2008/729)
 Social Security Revaluation of Earnings Factors Order 2008 (S.I. 2008/730)
 Occupational Pension Schemes (Employer Debt and Miscellaneous Amendments) Regulations 2008 (S.I. 2008/731)
 Measuring Instruments (EEC Requirements) (Fees) (Amendment) Regulations 2008 (S.I. 2008/732)
 Financial Services and Markets Act 2000 (Consequential Amendments) Order 2008 (S.I. 2008/733)
 National Savings Bank (Amendment) Regulations 2008 (S.I. 2008/734)
 Abortion (Amendment) Regulations 2008 (S.I. 2008/735)
 Health and Safety (Fees) Regulations 2008 (S.I. 2008/736)
 Insolvency (Amendment) Rules 2008 (S.I. 2008/737)
 Non-automatic Weighing Instruments (Amendment) Regulations 2008 (S.I. 2008/738)
 Companies (Tables A to F) (Amendment) Regulations 2008 (S.I. 2008/739)
 Income Tax (Construction Industry Scheme) (Amendment) Regulations 2008 (S.I. 2008/740)
 Regional Learning and Skills Councils Regulations 2008 (S.I. 2008/741)
 National Assistance (Assessment of Resources and Sums for Personal Requirements) (Amendment) (Wales) Regulations 2008 (S.I. 2008/743)
 Local Authorities (Functions and Responsibilities) (England) (Amendment No. 2) Regulations 2008 (S.I. 2008/744)
 Mental Health Act 2007 (Commencement No. 4) Order 2008 (S.I. 2008/745)
 Derwentside (Parish Electoral Arrangements) Order 2008 (S.I. 2008/746)
 Borough of Berwick-upon-Tweed (Parish Electoral Arrangements and Electoral Changes) Order 2008 (S.I. 2008/747)
 Stratford-on-Avon (Parish Electoral Arrangements and Electoral Changes) Order 2008 (S.I. 2008/748)
 Tribunals, Courts and Enforcement Act 2007 (Commencement No. 3) Order 2008 (S.I. 2008/749)
 East Suffolk Internal Drainage Board Order 2008 (S.I. 2008/750)
 Charities Act 2006 (Commencement No. 3, Transitional Provisions and Savings) Order 2008 (S.I. 2008/751)
 Children Act 2004 (Commencement No. 9) Order 2008 (S.I. 2008/752)
 Hydrocarbon Oil, Biofuels and Other Fuel Substitutes (Determination of Composition of a Substance and Miscellaneous Amendments) Regulations 2008 (S.I. 2008/753)
 Other Fuel Substitutes (Rates of Excise Duty etc.) (Amendment) Order 2008 (S.I. 2008/754)
 Serious Crime Act 2007 (Commencement No. 2 and Transitional and Transitory Provisions and Savings) Order 2008 (S.I. 2008/755)
 Stroud (Parish Electoral Arrangements and Electoral Changes) Order 2008 (S.I. 2008/756)
 Traffic Management Act 2004 (Commencement No. 5 and Transitional Provisions) (England) (Amendment) Order 2008 (S.I. 2008/757)
 Social Security (Jobcentre Plus Interviews for Partners) Amendment Regulations 2008 (S.I. 2008/759)
 Asylum Support (Amendment) Regulations 2008 (S.I. 2008/760)
 Landfill Tax (Amendment) Regulations 2008 (S.I. 2008/770)
 Taxes (Interest Rate) (Amendment) Regulations 2008 (S.I. 2008/778)
 Rice Products from the United States of America (Restriction on First Placing on the Market) (Wales) Regulations 2008 (S.I. 2008/781)
 Income Tax (Pay As You Earn) (Amendment) Regulations 2008 (S.I. 2008/782)
 Designation of Schools Having a Religious Character (Independent Schools) (England) Order 2008 (S.I. 2008/783)
 Childcare Act 2006 (Commencement No. 4) Order 2008 (S.I. 2008/785)
 Immigration (Disposal of Property) Regulations 2008 (S.I. 2008/786)
 Welfare Reform Act 2007 (Commencement No. 6 and Consequential Provisions) Order 2008 (S.I. 2008/787)
 Local Authorities (Model Code of Conduct) (Wales) Order 2008 (S.I. 2008/788)
 Transport of Animals (Cleansing and Disinfection) (Wales) (No. 3) (Amendment) Order 2008 (S.I. 2008/789)
 Police and Justice Act 2006 (Commencement No. 8) Order 2008 (S.I. 2008/790)
 Violent Crime Reduction Act 2006 (Commencement No. 5) Order 2008 (S.I. 2008/791)
 Statistics and Registration Service Act 2007 (Delegation of Functions) (Economic Statistics) Order 2008 (S.I. 2008/792)
 Childcare (Voluntary Registration) (Amendment) Regulations 2008 (S.I. 2008/793)
 Employment and Support Allowance Regulations 2008 (S.I. 2008/794)
 Employment and Support Allowance (Transitional Provisions) Regulations 2008 (S.I. 2008/795)
 Tax Credits Up-rating Regulations 2008 (S.I. 2008/796)
 Child Benefit Up-rating Order 2008 (S.I. 2008/797)
 Guardian's Allowance Up-rating Order 2008 (S.I. 2008/798)
 Guardian's Allowance Up-rating (Northern Ireland) Order 2008 (S.I. 2008/799)
 Mental Health Act 2007 (Commencement No. 5 and Transitional Provisions) Order 2008 (S.I. 2008/800)

801-900

 Bede Sixth Form College, Billingham (Dissolution) Order 2008 (S.I. 2008/812)
 Government Resources and Accounts Act 2000 (Audit of Public Bodies) Order 2008 (S.I. 2008/817)
 Consumer Credit Act 2006 (Commencement No. 4 and Transitional Provisions) Order 2008 (S.I. 2008/831)
 Income Tax (Professional Fees) Order 2008 (S.I. 2008/836)
 Income Tax (Payments on Account) (Amendment) Regulations 2008 (S.I. 2008/838)
 Statistics and Registration Service Act 2007 (Commencement No. 2 and Transitional Provision) Order 2008 (S.I. 2008/839)
 Guardian's Allowance Up-rating Regulations 2008 (S.I. 2008/840)
 Grants to the Churches Conservation Trust Order 2008 (S.I. 2008/842)
 National Health Service (Travel Expenses and Remission of Charges) Amendment Regulations 2008 (S.I. 2008/843)
 Trustees for the St Mary's National Health Service Trust (Transfer of Trust Property) Order 2008 (S.I. 2008/894)
 Trustees for the Hammersmith Hospitals National Health Service Trust (Transfer of Trust Property) Order 2008 (S.I. 2008/895)
 Housing Act 2004 (Commencement No. 11) (England and Wales) Order 2008 (S.I. 2008/898)

901-1000

 Consumers, Estate Agents and Redress Act 2007 (Commencement No. 4) Order 2008 (S.I. 2008/905)
 National Health Service Pension Scheme (Correction to Amendment) Regulations 2008 (S.I. 2008/906)
 Bedfordshire (Structural Changes) Order 2008 (S.I. 2008/907)
 Department for Transport (Driver Licensing and Vehicle Registration Fees) (Amendment) Order 2008 (S.I. 2008/908)
 Pension Protection Fund (Pension Compensation Cap) Order 2008 (S.I. 2008/909)
 Occupational Pension Schemes (Levies) (Amendment) Regulations 2008 (S.I. 2008/910)
 Occupational Pension Schemes (Levy Ceiling) Order 2008 (S.I. 2008/911)
 Offender Management Act 2007 (Consequential Amendments) Order 2008 (S.I. 2008/912)
 Civil Enforcement of Parking Contraventions (Penalty Charge Notices, Enforcement and Adjudication) (Wales) (Amendment) Regulations 2008 (S.I. 2008/913)
 Stamp Duty Reserve Tax (virt-x Exchange Limited) (Amendment) Regulations 2008 (S.I. 2008/914)
 Local Involvement Networks (Duty of Services-Providers to Allow Entry) Regulations 2008 (S.I. 2008/915)
 Plastic Materials and Articles in Contact with Food (England) Regulations 2008 (S.I. 2008/916)
 Local Government and Public Involvement in Health Act 2007 (Commencement No. 5 and Transitional, Saving and Transitory Provision) Order 2008 (S.I. 2008/917)
 Tate Gallery Board (Additional Members) Order 2008 (S.I. 2008/919)
 Crown Agents Holding and Realisation Board (Prescribed Day) Order 2008 (S.I. 2008/921)
 North Glamorgan National Health Service Trust (Transfer of Staff, Property, Rights and Liabilities) Order 2008 (S.I. 2008/922)
 Education (QCA Levy) (Revocation) Regulations 2008 (S.I. 2008/923)
 Pontypridd and Rhondda National Health Service Trust (Transfer of Staff, Property, Rights and Liabilities) Order 2008 (S.I. 2008/924)
 Rail Vehicle Accessibility (B2007 Vehicles) Exemption Order 2008 (S.I. 2008/925)
 Swansea National Health Service Trust (Transfer of staff, Property, Rights and Liabilities) Order 2008 (S.I. 2008/926)
 Bro Morgannwg National Health Service Trust (Transfer of Staff, Property, Rights and Liabilities) Order 2008 (S.I. 2008/927)
 Official Statistics Order 2008 (S.I. 2008/928)
 Relevant Authorities (Code of Conduct) (Prescribed Period for Undertakings) (Wales) Order 2008 (S.I. 2008/929)
 Safeguarding Vulnerable Groups Act 2006 (Commencement No. 1) (Northern Ireland) Order 2008 (S.I. 2008/930)
 Carmarthenshire National Health Service Trust (Transfer of Staff, Property, Rights and Liabilities) Order 2008 (S.I. 2008/931)
 Pontypridd and Rhondda National Health Service Trust (Dissolution) Order 2008 (S.I. 2008/932)
 Carmarthenshire National Health Service Trust (Dissolution) Order 2008 (S.I. 2008/933)
 Ceredigion and Mid Wales National Health Service Trust (Dissolution) Order 2008 (S.I. 2008/934)
 Ceredigion and Mid Wales National Health Service Trust (Transfer of Staff, Property, Rights and Liabilities) Order 2008 (S.I. 2008/935)
 Pembrokeshire and Derwen National Health Service Trust (Transfer of Staff, Property, Rights and Liabilities) Order 2008 (S.I. 2008/936)
 Pembrokeshire and Derwen National Health Service Trust (Dissolution) Order 2008 (S.I. 2008/937)
 Swansea National Health Service Trust (Dissolution) Order 2008 (S.I. 2008/938)
 Bro Morgannwg National Health Service Trust (Dissolution) Order 2008 (S.I. 2008/939)
 North Glamorgan National Health Service Trust (Dissolution) Order 2008 (S.I. 2008/940)
 Medicines for Human Use (Clinical Trials) and Blood Safety and Quality (Amendment) Regulations 2008 (S.I. 2008/941)
 Specified Animal Pathogens Order 2008 (S.I. 2008/944)
 Charities Act 2006 (Commencement No. 4, Transitional Provisions and Savings) Order 2008 (S.I. 2008/945)
 Proceeds of Crime Act 2002 (Investigations in England, Wales and Northern Ireland: Code of Practice) Order 2008 (S.I. 2008/946)
 Proceeds of Crime Act 2002 (Cash Searches: Code of Practice) Order 2008 (S.I. 2008/947)
 Companies Act 2006 (Consequential Amendments etc.) Order 2008 (S.I. 2008/948)
 Serious Crime Act 2007 (Amendment of the Proceeds of Crime Act 2002) Order 2008 (S.I. 2008/949)
 Protection of Military Remains Act 1986 (Designation of Vessels and Controlled Sites) Order 2008 (S.I. 2008/950)
 Borough of Tewkesbury (Parish Electoral Arrangements) Order 2008 (S.I. 2008/951)
 Companies Act 2006 (Consequential Amendments) (Taxes and National Insurance) Order 2008 (S.I. 2008/954)
 Clean Neighbourhoods and Environment Act 2005 (Commencement No. 5) Order 2008 (S.I. 2008/956)
 Criminal Defence Service (Funding) (Amendment) Order 2008 (S.I. 2008/957)
 Town and Country Planning (Fees for Applications and Deemed Applications) (Amendment) (England) Regulations 2008 (S.I. 2008/958)
 Housing Benefit and Council Tax Benefit (Extended Payments) Amendment Regulations 2008 (S.I. 2008/959)
 Legislative Reform (Health and Safety Executive) Order 2008 (S.I. 2008/960)
 Childcare (Supply and Disclosure of Information) (England) (Amendment) Regulations 2008 (S.I. 2008/961)
 Bluetongue Regulations 2008 (S.I. 2008/962)
 Sex Discrimination (Amendment of Legislation) Regulations 2008 (S.I. 2008/963)
 River Humber (Upper Burcom Tidal Stream Generator) Order 2008 (S.I. 2008/969)
 Blood Tests (Evidence of Paternity) (Amendment) Regulations 2008 (S.I. 2008/972)
 Criminal Justice Act 1988 (Offensive Weapons) (Amendment) Order 2008 (S.I. 2008/973)
 Childcare (Early Years Register) Regulations 2008 (S.I. 2008/974)
 Childcare (General Childcare Register) Regulations 2008 (S.I. 2008/975)
 Childcare (Early Years and General Childcare Registers) (Common Provisions) Regulations 2008 (S.I. 2008/976)
 Early Removal of Short-Term and Long-Term Prisoners (Amendment of Requisite Period) Order 2008 (S.I. 2008/977)
 Early Removal of Fixed-Term Prisoners (Amendment of Eligibility Period) Order 2008 (S.I. 2008/978)
 Childcare (Exemptions from Registration) Order 2008 (S.I. 2008/979)
 Ellesmere Port and Neston (Parish) (Amendment) Order 2008 (S.I. 2008/980)
 Local Government Finance (England) (Substitution of Penalties) Order 2008 (S.I. 2008/981)
 Further Education and Training Act 2007 (Commencement No. 2) (Wales) Order 2008 (S.I. 2008/983)
 Sea Fishing (Enforcement of Community Measures) (Penalty Notices) Order 2008 (S.I. 2008/984)

1001-1100

 Transfer of Functions (Miscellaneous) Order 2008 (S.I. 2008/1034)
 Scotland Act 1998 (Agency Arrangements) (Specification) Order 2008 (S.I. 2008/1035)
 National Assembly for Wales (Legislative Competence) (Education and Training) Order 2008 (S.I. 2008/1036)
 Medical Act 1983 (Qualifying Examinations) Order 2008 (S.I. 2008/1037)
 Motor Vehicles (Driving Licences) (Amendment No. 2) Regulations 2008 (S.I. 2008/1038)
 Bovine Semen (Wales) Regulations 2008 (S.I. 2008/1040)
 Social Security (Miscellaneous Amendments) (No.2) Regulations 2008 (S.I. 2008/1042)
 Occupational Pension Schemes (Transfer Values) (Amendment) Regulations 2008 (S.I. 2008/1050)
 Civil Enforcement of Parking Contraventions (County of Devon) Designation Order 2008 (S.I. 2008/1051)
 Magistrates’ Courts Fees Order 2008 (S.I. 2008/1052)
 Civil Proceedings Fees Order 2008 (S.I. 2008/1053)
 Family Proceedings Fees Order 2008 (S.I. 2008/1054)
 Civil Enforcement of Parking Contraventions (County of Cornwall) Designation Order 2008 (S.I. 2008/1055)
 Safeguarding Vulnerable Groups Act 2006 (Prescribed Criteria) (Transitional Provisions) Regulations 2008 (S.I. 2008/1062)
 Seed Potatoes (Wales) (Amendment) Regulations 2008 (S.I. 2008/1063)
 Zootechnical Standards (Amendment) (Wales) Regulations 2008 (S.I. 2008/1064)
 Further Education and Training Act 2007 (Commencement No. 1) (England and Wales) Order 2008 (S.I. 2008/1065)
 Disease Control (England) (Amendment) Order 2008 (S.I. 2008/1066)
 Trade Marks (Earlier Trade Marks) Regulations 2008 (S.I. 2008/1067)
 Occupational Pension Schemes (Employer Debt – Apportionment Arrangements) (Amendment) Regulations 2008 (S.I. 2008/1068)
 Specified Products from China (Restriction on First Placing on the Market) (England) Regulations 2008 (S.I. 2008/1079)
 Specified Products from China (Restriction on First Placing on the Market) (Wales) Regulations 2008 (S.I. 2008/1080)
 Heather and Grass etc. Burning (Wales) Regulations 2008 (S.I. 2008/1081)
 Employment and Support Allowance (Consequential Provisions) Regulations 2008 (S.I. 2008/1082)
 Local Government Pension Scheme (Amendment) Regulations 2008 (S.I. 2008/1083)
 Civil Enforcement of Parking Contraventions (County of Cheshire) (Borough of Macclesfield) Designation Order 2008 (S.I. 2008/1084)
 Standards Committee (England) Regulations 2008 (S.I. 2008/1085)
 Civil Enforcement of Parking Contraventions (County of Nottinghamshire) Designation Order 2008 (S.I. 2008/1086)
 Control of Major Accident Hazard (Amendment) Regulations 2008 (S.I. 2008/1087)
 Asylum and Immigration Tribunal (Procedure) (Amendment) Rules 2008 (S.I. 2008/1088)
 Asylum and Immigration Tribunal (Fast Track Procedure) (Amendment) Rules 2008 (S.I. 2008/1089)
 Bluetongue (Wales) Regulations 2008 (S.I. 2008/1090)
 Bathing Water Regulations 2008 (S.I. 2008/1097)
 Export Control (Burma) Order 2008 (S.I. 2008/1098)

1101-1200

 Common Agricultural Policy Single Payment and Support Schemes (Amendment) Regulations 2008 (S.I. 2008/1139)
 Friendly Societies Act 1992 (Accounts, Audit and EEA State Amendments) Order 2008 (S.I. 2008/1140)
 National Savings Bank (Amendment) (No. 2) Regulations 2008 (S.I. 2008/1142)
 Friendly Societies Act 1992 (Accounts, Audit and EEA State Amendments) Order 2008 (S.I. 2008/1143)
 Friendly Societies (Accounts and Related Provisions) (Amendment) Regulations 2008 (S.I. 2008/1144)
 Value Added Tax (Buildings and Land) Order 2008 (S.I. 2008/1146)
 Health Act 2006 (Commencement No. 4) Order 2008 (S.I. 2008/1147)
 National Health Service Delegation of Functions to the NHS Business Services Authority (Awdurdod Gwasanaethau Busnes y GIG) (Counter Fraud and Security Management) Regulations 2008 (S.I. 2008/1148)
 Membership of the Tribunal Procedure Committee Transitional Order 2008 (S.I. 2008/1149)
 Tribunals, Courts and Enforcement Act 2007 (Commencement No. 4) Order 2008 (S.I. 2008/1158)
 Protection of Cultural Objects on Loan (Publication and Provision of Information) Regulations 2008 (S.I. 2008/1159)
 Teesport Harbour Revision Order 2008 (S.I. 2008/1160)
 Medicines for Human Use (Prescribing) (Miscellaneous Amendments) Order 2008 (S.I. 2008/1161)
 Medicines (Sale or Supply) (Miscellaneous Amendments) Regulations 2008 (S.I. 2008/1162)
 Electricity and Gas (Billing) Regulations 2008 (S.I. 2008/1163)
 National Savings Bank (Amendment) (No. 3) Regulations 2008 (S.I. 2008/1164)
 Football Spectators (2008 European Championship Control Period) Order 2008 (S.I. 2008/1165)
 Lyon Court and Office Fees (Variation) Order 2008 (S.I. 2008/1166)
 Discretionary Housing Payments (Grants) Amendment Order 2008 (S.I. 2008/1167)
 Transmissible Spongiform Encephalopathies (No. 2) (Amendment) Regulations 2008 (S.I. 2008/1180)
 Commission for Healthcare Audit and Inspection (Defence Medical Services) Regulations 2008 (S.I. 2008/1181)
 Transmissible Spongiform Encephalopathies (Wales) (Amendment) Regulations 2008 (S.I. 2008/1182)
 Immigration (Biometric Registration) (Pilot) Regulations 2008 (S.I. 2008/1183)
 Mental Health (Hospital, Guardianship and Treatment) (England) Regulations 2008 (S.I. 2008/1184)
 General Ophthalmic Services Contracts Regulations 2008 (S.I. 2008/1185)
 Primary Ophthalmic Services Regulations 2008 (S.I. 2008/1186)
 National Health Service (Performers Lists) Amendment and Transitional Provisions Regulations 2008 (S.I. 2008/1187)
 Food Labelling (Declaration of Allergens) (England) Regulations 2008 (S.I. 2008/1188)
 Disabled Facilities Grants (Maximum Amounts and Additional Purposes) (England) Order 2008 (S.I. 2008/1189)
 Housing Renewal Grants (Amendment) (England) Regulations 2008 (S.I. 2008/1190)

1201-1300

 Reciprocal Enforcement of Maintenance Orders (Designation of Reciprocating Countries) Order 2008 (S.I. 2008/1202)
 Maintenance Orders (Facilities for Enforcement) (Revocation) Order 2008 (S.I. 2008/1203)
 Mental Health (Mutual Recognition) Regulations 2008 (S.I. 2008/1204)
 Mental Health (Conflicts of Interest) (England) Regulations 2008 (S.I. 2008/1205)
 Mental Health (Approved Mental Health Professionals) (Approval) (England) Regulations 2008 (S.I. 2008/1206)
 Mental Health (Nurses) (England) Order 2008 (S.I. 2008/1207)
 Defence Aviation Repair Agency Trading Fund (Revocation) Order 2008 (S.I. 2008/1208)
 Primary Ophthalmic Services Transitional Provisions Regulations 2008 (S.I. 2008/1209)
 Mental Health Act 2007 (Commencement No. 6 and After-care under Supervision: Savings, Modifications and Transitional Provisions) Order 2008 (S.I. 2008/1210)
 Civil Enforcement of Parking Contraventions (County of Rutland) Designation Order 2008 (S.I. 2008/1211)
 Civil Enforcement of Parking Contraventions (County of Gloucestershire) (Forest of Dean District) Designation Order 2008 (S.I. 2008/1212)
 Street Works (Inspection Fees) (Wales) (Amendment) (No. 2) Regulations 2008 1213)
 Civil Enforcement of Parking Contraventions (General Provisions) (Wales) (No. 2) Regulations 2008 (S.I. 2008/1214)
 Civil Enforcement of Parking Contraventions (Approved Devices) (Wales) (No. 2) Order 2008 (S.I. 2008/1215)
 Criminal Justice (Northern Ireland) Order 2008 (S.I. 2008/1216)
 Plastic Materials and Articles in Contact with Food (Wales) Regulations 2008 (S.I. 2008/1237)
 Teesport (Land Acquisition) Order 2008 (S.I. 2008/1238)
 Air Navigation (Restriction of Flying) (Scottish Highlands) Regulations 2008 (S.I. 2008/1239)
 British Overseas Territories Citizenship (Designated Service) (Amendment) Order 2008 (S.I. 2008/1240)
 Criminal Justice (Northern Ireland Consequential Amendments) Order 2008 (S.I. 2008/1241)
 Northern Ireland Act 1998 (Modification) Order 2008 (S.I. 2008/1242)
 Merchant Shipping (Categorisation of Registries of Relevant British Possessions) (Amendment) Order 2008 (S.I. 2008/1243)
 General Medical Council (Fitness to Practise) (Amendment in Relation to Standard of Proof) Rules Order of Council 2008 (S.I. 2008/1256)
 School Admissions (Alteration and Variation of, and Objections to, Arrangements) (England) (Amendment) Regulations 2008 (S.I. 2008/1258)
 Education (Fees and Awards) (Wales) Regulations 2008 (S.I. 2008/1259)
 London Gateway Port Harbour Empowerment Order 2008 (S.I. 2008/1261)
 Consumers, Estate Agents and Redress Act 2007 (Commencement No. 3 and Supplementary Provision) Order 2008 (S.I. 2008/1262)
 Offender Management Act 2007 (Approved Premises) Regulations 2008 (S.I. 2008/1263)
 Local Government and Public Involvement in Health Act 2007 (Commencement No. 6 and Transitional and Saving Provision) Order 2008 (S.I. 2008/1265)
 Home Information Pack (Amendment) (No. 2) Regulations 2008 (S.I. 2008/1266)
 Measuring Instruments (EC Requirements) (Amendment) Regulations 2008 (S.I. 2008/1267)
 Food Labelling (Declaration of Allergens) (Wales) Regulations 2008 (S.I. 2008/1268)
 Primary Care Trusts and National Health Service Trusts (Membership and Procedure) Amendment Regulations 2008 (S.I. 2008/1269)
 Specified Animal Pathogens (Wales) Order 2008 (S.I. 2008/1270)
 Freedom of Information (Additional Public Authorities) Order 2008 (S.I. 2008/1271)
 Financial Assistance For Industry (Increase of Limit) Order 2008 (S.I. 2008/1272)
 Assembly Learning Grants and Loans (Higher Education) (Wales) Regulations 2008 (S.I. 2008/1273)
 Products of Animal Origin (Disease Control) (Wales) Regulations 2008 (S.I. 2008/1275)
 Business Protection from Misleading Marketing Regulations 2008 S.I. 2008/1276)
 Consumer Protection from Unfair Trading Regulations 2008 S.I. 2008/1277)
 Export of Goods, Transfer of Technology and Provision of Technical Assistance (Control) (Amendment) Order 2008 (S.I. 2008/1281)
 Income Tax (Construction Industry Scheme) (Amendment No. 2) Regulations 2008 (S.I. 2008/1282)
 Cosmetic Products (Safety) Regulations 2008 (S.I. 2008/1284)
 Recreation Grounds (Revocation of Parish Council Byelaws) Order 2008 (S.I. 2008/1285)
 Regional Transport Planning (Wales) (Amendment) Order 2008 (S.I. 2008/1286)
 Spreadable Fats (Marketing Standards) and the Milk and Milk Products (Protection of Designations) (England) Regulations 2008 (S.I. 2008/1287)

1301-1400

 Motor Vehicles (Driving Licences) (Amendment No. 3) Regulations 2008 (S.I. 2008/1312)
 Disease Control (Wales) (Amendment) Order 2008 1314)
 Mental Capacity (Deprivation of Liberty: Appointment of Relevant Person's Representative) Regulations 2008 (S.I. 2008/1315)
 Electoral Administration Act 2006 (Commencement No. 7) Order 2008 (S.I. 2008/1316)
 Drinking Milk (England) Regulations 2008 (S.I. 2008/1317)
 Northern Ireland (Miscellaneous Provisions) Act 2006 (Commencement No. 4) Order 2008 (S.I. 2008/1318)
 Electoral Administration Act 2006 (Regulation of Loans etc.: Northern Ireland) Order 2008 (S.I. 2008/1319)
 Safeguarding Vulnerable Groups Act 2006 (Commencement No. 2) Order 2008 (S.I. 2008/1320)
 Shrewsbury and Atcham (Parish) Order 2008 (S.I. 2008/1321)
 Fisheries and Aquaculture Structures (Grants) (England) (Amendment) Regulations 2008 (S.I. 2008/1322)
 Cambridgeshire and Peterborough Mental Health Partnership National Health Service Trust (Transfer of Trust Property) Order 2008 (S.I. 2008/1323)
 Assembly Learning Grants (European Institutions) (Wales) (Amendment) Regulations 2008 (S.I. 2008/1324)
 Serious Organised Crime and Police Act 2005 (Commencement No. 13) Order 2008 (S.I. 2008/1325)
 Gambling Act 2005 (Commencement No. 8) Order 2008 (S.I. 2008/1326)
 Gambling (Geographical Distribution of Large and Small Casino Premises Licences) Order 2008 (S.I. 2008/1327)
 Community Legal Service (Funding) (Amendment) Order 2008 (S.I. 2008/1328)
 National Health Service (General Medical Services Contracts) (Wales) (Amendment) Regulations 2008 (S.I. 2008/1329)
 Categories of Casino Regulations 2008 (S.I. 2008/1330)
 Architects (Recognition of European Qualifications etc. and Saving and Transitional Provision) Regulations 2008 (S.I. 2008/1331)
 Road Traffic Offenders (Prescribed Devices) Order 2008 (S.I. 2008/1332)
 Health and Social Care (Community Health and Standards) Act 2003 (Commencement No. 12) Order 2008 (S.I. 2008/1334)
 Disability Discrimination Code of Practice (Trade Organisations, Qualifications Bodies and General Qualifications Bodies) (Commencement) Order 2008 (S.I. 2008/1335)
 Disability Discrimination Code of Practice (Trade Organisations and Qualifications Bodies) (Revocation) Order 2008 (S.I. 2008/1336)
 Immigration and Nationality (Cost Recovery Fees) (Amendment No. 2) Regulations 2008 (S.I. 2008/1337)
 Abortion (Amendment) (Wales) Regulations 2008 (S.I. 2008/1338)
 Value Added Tax (Refund of Tax to Museums and Galleries) (Amendment) Order 2008 (S.I. 2008/1339)
 Civil Enforcement of Parking Contraventions (County of Wiltshire) (District of West Wiltshire) Designation Order 2008 (S.I. 2008/1340)
 Spreadable Fats (Marketing Standards) and the Milk and Milk Products (Protection of Designations) (Wales) Regulations 2008 (S.I. 2008/1341)
 European Regional Development Fund (London Operational Programme) (Implementation) Regulations 2008 (S.I. 2008/1342)
 Cash Ratio Deposits (Value Bands and Ratios) Order 2008 (S.I. 2008/1344)
 Fire and Rescue Services (National Framework) (England) Order 2008 (S.I. 2008/1370)
 Town and Country Planning (Local Development) (England) (Amendment) Regulations 2008 (S.I. 2008/1371)
 Greater London Authority Act 2007 (Commencement No.4 and Saving) Order 2008 (S.I. 2008/1372)
 Kingston upon Hull City Council (Scale Lane Bridge) Scheme 2008 Confirmation Instrument 2008 (S.I. 2008/1373)

1401-1500

 Motor Vehicles (Tests) (Amendment) Regulations 2008 (S.I. 2008/1402)
 Technology Strategy Board (Transfer of Property etc.) Order 2008 (S.I. 2008/1405)
 Crime and Disorder (Prescribed Information) (Amendment) Regulations 2008 (S.I. 2008/1406)
 Violent Crime Reduction Act 2006 (Commencement No. 6) Order 2008 (S.I. 2008/1407)
 Education (National Curriculum) (Modern Foreign Languages) (Wales) Order 2008 (S.I. 2008/1408)
 Education (National Curriculum) (Attainment Targets and Programmes of Study) (Wales) Order 2008 (S.I. 2008/1409)
 Value Added Tax (Reduced Rate) (Smoking Cessation Products) Order 2008 (S.I. 2008/1410)
 Manchester College of Arts and Technology and City College, Manchester (Dissolution) Order 2008 (S.I. 2008/1418)
 Local Government (Structural and Boundary Changes) (Staffing) Regulations 2008 (S.I. 2008/1419)
 Television Multiplex Services (Reservation of Digital Capacity) Order 2008 (S.I. 2008/1420)
 Multiplex Licence (Broadcasting of Programmes in Gaelic) Order 2008 (S.I. 2008/1421)
 Reconstitution of the Welland and Deepings Internal Drainage Board Order 2008 (S.I. 2008/1422)
 Reconstitution of the Black Sluice Internal Drainage Board Order 2008 (S.I. 2008/1423)
 Criminal Justice Act 2003 (Commencement No. 21) Order 2008 (S.I. 2008/1424)
 National Health Service (Primary Medical Services) and (Performers Lists) (Miscellaneous Amendments) (Wales) Regulations 2008 (S.I. 2008/1425)
 Mutilations (Permitted Procedures) (England) (Amendment) Regulations 2008 (S.I. 2008/1426)
 Building Societies (Financial Assistance) Order 2008 (S.I. 2008/1427)
 Reporting of Prices of Milk Products (England) Regulations 2008 (S.I. 2008/1428)
 Education and Inspections Act 2006 (Commencement No. 1 and Saving Provisions) (Wales) Order 2008 (S.I. 2008/1429)
 Local Authorities (Alcohol Disorder Zones) Regulations 2008 (S.I. 2008/1430)
 Social Security (Contributions) (Amendment No. 4) Regulations 2008 (S.I. 2008/1431)
 Financial Assistance Scheme (Miscellaneous Provisions) Regulations 2008 (S.I. 2008/1432)
 Design Right (Semiconductor Topographies) (Amendment) (No. 2) Regulations 2008 (S.I. 2008/1434)
 Motor Vehicles (Driving Licences) (Amendment) (No. 4) Regulations 2008 (S.I. 2008/1435)
 Legal Services Act 2007 (Commencement No. 2 and Transitory Provisions) Order 2008 (S.I. 2008/1436)
 Local Authority Targets (Well-Being of Young Children) (Amendment) Regulations 2008 (S.I. 2008/1437)
 Tope (Prohibition of Fishing) (Wales) Order 2008 (S.I. 2008/1438)
 Financial Services and Markets Act 2000 (Market Abuse) Regulations 2008 (S.I. 2008/1439)
 Whole of Government Accounts (Designation of Bodies) Order 2008 (S.I. 2008/1440)
 Compensation (Claims Management Services) (Amendment) Regulations 2008 (S.I. 2008/1441)
 Motor Vehicles (Approval) (Fees) (Amendment) Regulations 2008 (S.I. 2008/1443)
 Road Vehicles (Registration and Licensing) (Amendment) (No. 2) Regulations 2008 (S.I. 2008/1444)
 Public Service Vehicles (Conditions of Fitness, Equipment, Use and Certification) (Amendment) Regulations 2008 (S.I. 2008/1458)
 Public Service Vehicles Accessibility (Amendment) Regulations 2008 (S.I. 2008/1459)
 Goods Vehicles (Plating and Testing) (Amendment) Regulations 2008 (S.I. 2008/1460)
 Motor Vehicles (Tests) (Amendment) (No. 2) Regulations 2008 (S.I. 2008/1461)
 Motor Cycles Etc. (Single Vehicle Approval) (Fees) (Amendment) Regulations 2008 (S.I. 2008/1462)
 Authorised Investment Funds (Tax) (Amendment No. 2) Regulations 2008 (S.I. 2008/1463)
 Taxation of Benefits under Government Pilot Schemes (Up-Front Childcare Fund) Order 2008 (S.I. 2008/1464)
 Community Bus (Amendment) Regulations 2008 (S.I. 2008/1465)
 Criminal Justice and Immigration Act 2008 (Commencement No. 1 and Transitional Provisions) Order 2008 (S.I. 2008/1466)
 Financial Services and Markets Act 2000 (Control of Business Transfers)(Requirements on Applicants)(Amendment) Regulations 2008 (S.I. 2008/1467)
 Financial Services and Markets Act 2000 (Amendments to Part 7) Regulations 2008 (S.I. 2008/1468)
 Financial Services and Markets Act 2000 (Amendment of section 323) Regulations 2008 (S.I. 2008/1469)
 Public Service Vehicles (Registration of Local Services) (Amendment) (England and Wales) Regulations 2008 (S.I. 2008/1470)
 Cardiothoracic Centre–Liverpool National Health Service Trust (Change of Name) (Establishment) Amendment Order 2008 (S.I. 2008/1471)
 Dee Estuary Cockle Fishery Order 2008 (S.I. 2008/1472)
 Public Service Vehicles (Operators’ Licences) (Fees) (Amendment) Regulations 2008 (S.I. 2008/1473)
 Goods Vehicles (Licensing of Operators) (Fees) (Amendment) Regulations 2008 (S.I. 2008/1474)
 Child Maintenance and Other Payments Act 2008 (Commencement) Order 2008 (S.I. 2008/1476)
 Education (Mandatory Awards) (Amendment) Regulations 2008 (S.I. 2008/1477)
 Education (Student Support) (European Institutions) (Amendment) Regulations 2008 (S.I. 2008/1478)
 Education (Student Loans) (Amendment) (England and Wales) Regulations 2008 (S.I. 2008/1479)
 National Health Service (Travelling Expenses and Remission of Charges) (Wales) (Amendment) Regulations 2008 (S.I. 2008/1480)
 Income Tax (Purchased Life Annuities) (Amendment) Regulations 2008 (S.I. 2008/1481)
 Value Added Tax, etc. (Correction of Errors, etc.) Regulations 2008 (S.I. 2008/1482)
 Inspectors of Education, Children's Services and Skills (No. 2) Order 2008 (S.I. 2008/1484)
 Nursing and Midwifery (Amendment) Order 2008 (S.I. 2008/1485)
 Parliamentary Constituencies (Northern Ireland) Order 2008 (S.I. 2008/1486)
 Air Navigation (Isle of Man) (Amendment) Order 2008 (S.I. 2008/1487)
 Naval Medical Compassionate Fund (Amendment) Order 2008 (S.I. 2008/1488)
 Protection of Children and Vulnerable Adults and Care Standards Tribunal (Children's and Adults’ Barred Lists) (Transitional Provisions) Regulations 2008 (S.I. 2008/1497)

1501-1600

 Commissioner for Older People in Wales (Amendment) Regulations 2008 (S.I. 2008/1512)
 Civil Enforcement of Parking Contraventions (England) General (Amendment) Regulations 2008 (S.I. 2008/1513)
 Local Involvement Networks (Miscellaneous Amendments) Regulations 2008 (S.I. 2008/1514)
 Civil Enforcement of Parking Contraventions (The Borough Council of Dudley) Designation Order 2008 (S.I. 2008/1518)
 Building Societies Act 1986 (Accounts, Audit and EEA State Amendments) Order 2008 (S.I. 2008/1519)
 Energy-Saving Items (Corporation Tax) Regulations 2008 (S.I. 2008/1520)
 Finance Act 2007, Section 17(2) (Corporation Tax Deduction for Expenditure on Energy-Saving Items) (Appointed Day) Order 2008 (S.I. 2008/1521)
 Offshore Installations (Safety Zones) Order 2008 (S.I. 2008/1522)
 Feeding Stuffs (England) (Amendment) Regulations 2008 (S.I. 2008/1523)
 Social Security (Industrial Injuries) (Prescribed Diseases) Amendment (No. 2) Regulations 2008 (S.I. 2008/1552)
 Royal Pharmaceutical Society of Great Britain (Registration Amendment Rules) Order of Council 2008 (S.I. 2008/1553)
 Employment and Support Allowance (Consequential Provisions) (No. 2) Regulations 2008 (S.I. 2008/1554)
 Town and Country Planning (Environmental Impact Assessment) (Mineral Permissions and Amendment) (England) Regulations 2008 (S.I. 2008/1556)
 West Northamptonshire Joint Committee Order 2008 (S.I. 2008/1572)
 Education (Outturn Statements) (England) Regulations 2008 (S.I. 2008/1575)
 Goods Vehicles (Authorisation of International Journeys) (Fees) (Amendment) Regulations 2008 (S.I. 2008/1576)
 Road Transport (International Passenger Services) (Amendment) Regulations 2008 (S.I. 2008/1577)
 International Carriage of Dangerous Goods by Road (Fees) (Amendment) Regulations 2008 (S.I. 2008/1578)
 Corporation Tax (Implementation of the Mergers Directive) Regulations 2008 (S.I. 2008/1579)
 International Transport of Goods under Cover of TIR Carnets (Fees) (Amendment) Regulations 2008 (S.I. 2008/1580)
 Passenger and Goods Vehicles (Recording Equipment) (Approval of Fitters and Workshops) (Fees) (Amendment) Regulations 2008 (S.I. 2008/1581)
 Education (Student Support) (No.2) Regulations 2008 (S.I. 2008/1582)
 Bluetongue (Wales) (Amendment) Regulations 2008 (S.I. 2008/1583)
 Lyme Bay Designated Area (Fishing Restrictions) Order 2008 (S.I. 2008/1584)
 Air Force Act 1955 (Part 1) (Amendment) Regulations 2008 (S.I. 2008/1585)
 Criminal Justice and Immigration Act 2008 (Commencement No. 2 and Transitional and Saving Provisions) Order 2008 (S.I. 2008/1586)
 Criminal Justice and Immigration Act 2008 (Transitory Provisions) Order 2008 (S.I. 2008/1587)
 Taxation of Chargeable Gains (Gilt-edged Securities) Order 2008 (S.I. 2008/1588)
 Extradition Act 2003 (Amendment to Designations) Order 2008 (S.I. 2008/1589)
 Planning (National Security Directions and Appointed Representatives) (Scotland) Rules 2008 (S.I. 2008/1590)
 Legal Services Act 2007 (Commencement No. 2 and Transitory Provisions) (Amendment) Order 2008 (S.I. 2008/1591)
 Data Protection Act 1998 (Commencement No. 2) Order 2008 (S.I. 2008/1592)
 Education (Assisted Places) (Amendment) (England) Regulations 2008 (S.I. 2008/1593)
 Education (Assisted Places) (Incidental Expenses) (Amendment) (England) Regulations 2008 (S.I. 2008/1594)
 Mesothelioma Lump Sum Payments (Claims and Reconsiderations) Regulations 2008 (S.I. 2008/1595)
 Social Security (Recovery of Benefits) (Lump Sum Payments) Regulations 2008 (S.I. 2008/1596)
 Supply of Machinery (Safety) Regulations 2008 (S.I. 2008/1597)
 Home Loss Payments (Prescribed Amounts) (England) Regulations 2008 (S.I. 2008/1598)
 Social Security (Students and Miscellaneous Amendments) Regulations 2008 (S.I. 2008/1599)

1601-1700

 Industrial Training Levy (Reasonable Steps) Regulations 2008 (S.I. 2008/1639)
 Student Fees (Qualifying Courses and Persons) (England) (Amendment) Regulations 2008 (S.I. 2008/1640)
 Financial Services and Markets Act 2000 (Collective Investment Schemes) (Amendment) Order 2008 (S.I. 2008/1641)
 Plastic Materials and Articles in Contact with Food (England) (Amendment) Regulations 2008 (S.I. 2008/1642)
 Education (Designated Institutions) (Amendment) (England) Order 2008 (S.I. 2008/1643)
 Safety of Sports Grounds (Designation) (No. 2) Order 2008 (S.I. 2008/1644)
 Terrorism Act 2000 (Proscribed Organisations) (Amendment) Order 2008 (S.I. 2008/1645)
 Rice Products from the United States of America (Restriction on First Placing on the Market) (Wales) (Amendment) Regulations 2008 (S.I. 2008/1646)
 European Parliament (House of Lords Disqualification) Regulations 2008 (S.I. 2008/1647)
 North Wales National Health Service Trust (Establishment) Order 2008 (S.I. 2008/1648)
 Income-related Benefits (Subsidy to Authorities) Amendment (No. 3) Order 2008 (S.I. 2008/1649)
 Armed Forces Act 2006 (Commencement No. 3) Order 2008 (S.I. 2008/1650)
 Armed Forces (Service Inquiries) Regulations 2008 (S.I. 2008/1651)
 Coroners (Amendment) Rules 2008 (S.I. 2008/1652)
 Tribunals, Courts and Enforcement Act 2007 (Commencement No. 5 and Transitional Provisions) Order 2008 (S.I. 2008/1653)
 Magnetic Toys (Safety) Regulations 2008 (S.I. 2008/1654)
 Electoral Administration Act 2006 (Commencement No.1 and Transitional Provisions) (Northern Ireland) Order 2008 (S.I. 2008/1656)
 National Health Service (Optical Charges and Payments) Amendment (No. 2) Regulations 2008 (S.I. 2008/1657)
 Companies Act 1985 (Annual Return) and Companies (Principal Business Activities) (Amendment) Regulations 2008 (S.I. 2008/1659)
 Cross-border Railway Services (Working Time) Regulations 2008 (S.I. 2008/1660)
 Plastic Materials and Articles in Contact with Food (Wales) (No. 2) Regulations 2008 (S.I. 2008/1682)
 Medicines for Human Use (Prescribing by EEA Practitioners) Regulations 2008 (S.I. 2008/1692)
 Immigration (Registration Card) Order 2008 (S.I. 2008/1693)
 Armed Forces (Alignment of Service Discipline Acts) Order 2008 (S.I. 2008/1694)
 Immigration and Nationality (Fees) (Amendment No. 2) Regulations 2008 (S.I. 2008/1695)
 Armed Forces (Service Complaints) (Consequential Amendments) Order 2008 (S.I. 2008/1696)
 National Health Service (Charges for Drugs and Appliances) and (Travel Expenses and Remission of Charges) Amendment (No. 2) Regulations 2008 (S.I. 2008/1697)
 Armed Forces (Entry, Search and Seizure) (Amendment) Order 2008 (S.I. 2008/1698)
 Courts-Martial (Amendment) Rules 2008 (S.I. 2008/1699)
 Primary Ophthalmic Services Amendment, Transitional and Consequential Provisions Regulations 2008 (S.I. 2008/1700)

1701-1800

 Education (Hazardous Equipment and Materials in Schools) (Removal of Restrictions on Use) (England) Regulations 2008 (S.I. 2008/1701)
 Road Vehicles (Construction and Use) (Amendment) Regulations 2008 (S.I. 2008/1702)
 Estate Agents (Redress Scheme) Order 2008 (S.I. 2008/1712)
 Estate Agents (Redress Scheme) (Penalty Charge) Regulations 2008 (S.I. 2008/1713)
 Regulated Covered Bonds (Amendment) Regulations 2008 (S.I. 2008/1714)
 Vehicles Crime (Registration of Registration Plate Suppliers) Regulations 2008 (S.I. 2008/1715)
 Childcare Act 2006 (Provision of Information) (Wales) (Amendment) Regulations 2008 (S.I. 2008/1716)
 North East Wales National Health Service Trust (Dissolution) Order 2008 (S.I. 2008/1717)
 Eggs and Chicks (England) Regulations 2008 (S.I. 2008/1718)
 Conwy and Denbighshire National Health Service Trust (Dissolution) Order 2008 (S.I. 2008/1719)
 Conwy and Denbighshire National Health Service Trust (Transfer of Staff, Property, Rights and Liabilities) Order 2008 (S.I. 2008/1720)
 North East Wales National Health Service Trust (Transfer of Staff, Property, Rights and Liabilities) Order 2008 (S.I. 2008/1721)
 Childcare (Provision of Information About Young Children) (England) Regulations 2008 (S.I. 2008/1722)
 Education (School Inspection etc.) (England) (Amendment) Regulations 2008 (S.I. 2008/1723)
 Local Authority (Duty to Secure Early Years Provision Free of Charge) Regulations 2008 (S.I. 2008/1724)
 Financial Services and Markets Act 2000 (Control of Transfers of Business Done at Lloyd's) (Amendment) Order 2008 (S.I. 2008/1725)
 Service Voters’ Registration Period (Northern Ireland) Order 2008 (S.I. 2008/1726)
 Education (School Performance Information) (England) (Amendment) (No. 2) Regulations 2008 (S.I. 2008/1727)
 Education Act 2002 (Commencement No. 12) (Wales) Order 2008 (S.I. 2008/1728)
 Childcare (Inspections) Regulations 2008 (S.I. 2008/1729)
 Network Access Appeal Rules 2008 (S.I. 2008/1730)
 Adjudicator to Her Majesty's Land Registry (Practice and Procedure) (Amendment) Rules 2008 (S.I. 2008/1731)
 Education (National Curriculum) (Foundation Stage) (Wales) Order 2008 (S.I. 2008/1732)
 South Staffordshire College (Incorporation) Order 2008 (S.I. 2008/1733)
 South Staffordshire College (Government) Regulations 2008 (S.I. 2008/1734)
 Statutory Sick Pay (General) (Amendment) Regulations 2008 (S.I. 2008/1735)
 Education (Disapplication of the National Curriculum for Wales at Key Stage 1) (Wales) Regulations 2008 (S.I. 2008/1736)
 Political Parties, Elections and Referendums Act 2000 (Northern Ireland Political Parties) Order 2008 (S.I. 2008/1737)
 Company Names Adjudicator Rules 2008 (S.I. 2008/1738)
 Education (School Day and School Year) (Wales) (Amendment) Regulations 2008 (S.I. 2008/1739)
 Childcare (Disqualification) (Amendment) Regulations 2008 (S.I. 2008/1740)
 Representation of the People (Northern Ireland) Regulations 2008 (S.I. 2008/1741)
 Pigs (Records, Identification and Movement) (Wales) Order 2008 (S.I. 2008/1742)
 Early Years Foundation Stage (Exemptions from Learning and Development Requirements) Regulations 2008 (S.I. 2008/1743)
 Qualifications and Curriculum Authority (Additional Functions) Order 2008 (S.I. 2008/1744)
 Terrorism Act 2006 (Disapplication of Section 25) Order 2008 (S.I. 2008/1745)
 Rail Vehicle Accessibility (Interoperable Rail System) Regulations 2008 (S.I. 2008/1746)
 Education (Pupil Information) (England) (Amendment) Regulations 2008 (S.I. 2008/1747)
 Land Registration (Network Access) Rules 2008 (S.I. 2008/1748)
 Football Spectators (Seating) Order 2008 (S.I. 2008/1749)
 Land Registration (Electronic Conveyancing) Rules 2008 (S.I. 2008/1750)
 Consumer Credit (Information Requirements and Duration of Licences and Charges) (Amendment) Regulations 2008 (S.I. 2008/1751)
 Education (National Curriculum) (Attainment Targets and Programme of Study in Art and Design in respect of the Third Key Stage) (England) Order 2008 (S.I. 2008/1752)
 Education (National Curriculum) (Attainment Targets and Programmes of Study in Citizenship in respect of the Third and Fourth Key Stages) (England) Order 2008 (S.I. 2008/1753)
 Education (National Curriculum) (Attainment Targets and Programme of Study in Design and Technology in respect of the Third Key Stage) (England) Order 2008 (S.I. 2008/1754)
 Education (National Curriculum) (Attainment Targets and Programmes of Study in English in respect of the Third and Fourth Key Stages) (England) Order 2008 (S.I. 2008/1755)
 Education (National Curriculum) (Attainment Targets and Programme of Study in Geography in respect of the Third Key Stage) (England) Order 2008 (S.I. 2008/1756)
 Education (National Curriculum) (Attainment Targets and Programme of Study in History in respect of the Third Key Stage) (England) Order 2008 (S.I. 2008/1757)
 Education (National Curriculum) (Attainment Targets and Programmes of Study in Information and Communication Technology in respect of the Third and Fourth Key Stages) (England) Order 2008 (S.I. 2008/1758)
 Education (National Curriculum) (Attainment Targets and Programmes of Study in Mathematics in respect of the Third and Fourth Key Stages) (England) Order 2008 (S.I. 2008/1759)
 Education (National Curriculum) (Attainment Targets and Programme of Study in Modern Foreign Languages in respect of the Third Key Stage) (England) Order 2008 (S.I. 2008/1760)
 Education (National Curriculum) (Attainment Targets and Programme of Study in Music in respect of the Third Key Stage) (England) Order 2008 (S.I. 2008/1761)
 Education (National Curriculum) (Attainment Targets and Programmes of Study in Physical Education in respect of the Third and Fourth Key Stages) (England) Order 2008 (S.I. 2008/1762)
 Education (National Curriculum) (Attainment Targets and Programme of Study in Science in respect of the Third Key Stage) (England) Order 2008 (S.I. 2008/1763)
 Civil Enforcement of Parking Contraventions (Dudley) Designation Order 2008 (S.I. 2008/1764)
 Employers’ Liability (Compulsory Insurance) (Amendment) Regulations 2008 (S.I. 2008/1765)
 Education (National Curriculum) (Modern Foreign Languages) (England) Order 2008 (S.I. 2008/1766)
 Climate Change and Sustainable Energy Act 2006 (Sources of Energy and Technologies) Order 2008 (S.I. 2008/1767)
 Persons subject to Immigration Control (Housing Authority Accommodation and Homelessness) (Amendment) Order 2008 (S.I. 2008/1768)
 Sexual Offences (Northern Ireland) Order 2008 (S.I. 2008/1769)
 Double Taxation Relief and International Tax Enforcement (Taxes on Income and Capital) (Saudi Arabia) Order 2008 (S.I. 2008/1770)
 East Devon College, Tiverton (Dissolution) Order 2008 (S.I. 2008/1771)
 Dewsbury College (Dissolution) Order 2008 (S.I. 2008/1772)
 Rochdale Sixth Form College (Incorporation) Order 2008 (S.I. 2008/1773)
 Health Care and Associated Professions (Miscellaneous Amendments) Order 2008 (S.I. 2008/1774)
 North Cumbria Acute Hospitals National Health Service Trust (Change of Name) (Establishment) Amendment Order 2008 (S.I. 2008/1775)
 Scotland Act 1998 (Transfer of Functions to the Scottish Ministers etc.) Order 2008 (S.I. 2008/1776)
 Maximum Number of Judges Order 2008 (S.I. 2008/1777)
 Social Fund Winter Fuel Payment (Temporary Increase) Regulations 2008 (S.I. 2008/1778)
 Sexual Offences (Northern Ireland Consequential Amendments) Order 2008 (S.I. 2008/1779)
 Armed Forces, Army, Air Force and Naval Discipline Acts (Continuation) Order 2008 (S.I. 2008/1780)
 Ministerial and other Salaries Order 2008 (S.I. 2008/1781)
 Air Navigation (Amendment) Order 2008 (S.I. 2008/1782)
 Films Co-Production Agreements (Amendment) Order 2008 (S.I. 2008/1783)
 Inspectors of Education, Children's Services and Skills (No. 3) Order 2008 (S.I. 2008/1784)
 National Assembly for Wales (Legislative Competence) (Social Welfare) Order 2008 (S.I. 2008/1785)
 Welsh Ministers (Transfer of Functions) Order 2008 (S.I. 2008/1786)
 Education (National Curriculum) (Attainment Targets and Programmes of Study) (Wales) (Amendment) Order 2008 (S.I. 2008/1787)
 Scotland Act 1998 (Agency Arrangements) (Specification) (No. 2) Order 2008 (S.I. 2008/1788)
 International Tax Enforcement (Bermuda) Order 2008 (S.I. 2008/1789)
 Rochdale Sixth Form College (Government) Regulations 2008 (S.I. 2008/1790)
 Parliamentary Constituencies and Assembly Electoral Regions (Wales) (Amendment) Order 2008 (S.I. 2008/1791)
 European Communities (Designation) (No. 2) Order 2008 (S.I. 2008/1792)
 Double Taxation Relief and International Tax Enforcement (Taxes on Income and Capital) (New Zealand) Order 2008 (S.I. 2008/1793)
 Merchant Shipping (Liner Conferences) (Gibraltar) (Repeal) Order 2008 (S.I. 2008/1794)
 Double Taxation Relief and International Tax Enforcement (Taxes on Income and Capital) (Moldova) Order 2008 (S.I. 2008/1795)
 Double Taxation Relief and International Tax Enforcement (Taxes on Income and Capital) (Slovenia) Order 2008 (S.I. 2008/1796)
 Trade Marks Rules 2008 (S.I. 2008/1797)
 Children and Adoption Act 2006 (Commencement No. 2) Order 2008 (S.I. 2008/1798)
 Legal Services Act 2007 (Transitory Provision) Order 2008 (S.I. 2008/1799)
 Education (Nutritional Standards and Requirements for School Food) (England) (Amendment) Regulations 2008 (S.I. 2008/1800)

1801-1900

 Education (Independent School Inspection Fees and Publication) (England) Regulations 2008 (S.I. 2008/1801)
 Protection of Children and Vulnerable Adults and Care Standards Tribunal (Amendment) Regulations 2008 (S.I. 2008/1802)
 Gambling (Operating licence and Single-Machine Permit Fees) (Amendment) Regulations 2008 (S.I. 2008/1803)
 Childcare (Fees) Regulations 2008 (S.I. 2008/1804)
 Trade in Goods (Categories of Controlled Goods) Order 2008 (S.I. 2008/1805)
 Feeding Stuffs (Wales) (Amendment) Regulations 2008 (S.I. 2008/1806)
 Adoptions with a Foreign Element (Special Restrictions on Adoptions from Abroad) Regulations 2008 (S.I. 2008/1807)
 Special Restrictions on Adoptions from Abroad (Cambodia) Order 2008 (S.I. 2008/1808)
 Special Restrictions on Adoptions from Abroad (Guatemala) Order 2008 (S.I. 2008/1809)
 Pension Protection Fund (Entry Rules) Amendment Regulations 2008 (S.I. 2008/1810)
 Shrimp Fishing Nets (Wales) Order 2008 (S.I. 2008/1811)
 North Tees Teaching Primary Care Trust (Change of Name) Order 2008 (S.I. 2008/1812)
 Financial Services and Markets Act 2000 (Collective Investment Schemes) (Amendment) (No. 2) Order 2008 (S.I. 2008/1813)
 Stamp Duty and Stamp Duty Reserve Tax (Investment Exchanges and Clearing Houses) (European Central Counterparty Limited and the Turquoise Multilateral Trading Facility) Regulations 2008 (S.I. 2008/1814)
 Cancellation of Contracts made in a Consumer's Home or Place of Work etc. Regulations 2008 (S.I. 2008/1816)
 Port of Tyne Harbour Revision Order 2008 (S.I. 2008/1817)
 UK Borders Act 2007 (Commencement No. 3 and Transitional Provisions) Order 2008 (S.I. 2008/1818)
 Immigration (Notices) (Amendment) (No. 2) Regulations 2008 (S.I. 2008/1819)
 Competition Act 1998 (Public Policy Exclusion) Order 2008 (S.I. 2008/1820)
 Alternative Finance Arrangements (Community Investment Tax Relief) Order 2008 (S.I. 2008/1821)
 General Dental Council (Continuing Professional Development) (Dentists) Rules Order of Council 2008 (S.I. 2008/1822)
 General Dental Council (Continuing Professional Development) (Professions Complementary to Dentistry) Rules Order of Council 2008 (S.I. 2008/1823)
 Veterinary Surgeons’ Qualifications (European Recognition) Regulations 2008 (S.I. 2008/1824)
 Community Emissions Trading Scheme (Allocation of Allowances for Payment) Regulations 2008 (S.I. 2008/1825)
 Social Security (Students Responsible for Children or Young Persons) Amendment Regulations 2008 (S.I. 2008/1826)
 Local Authorities (Conduct of Referendums) (Wales) Regulations 2008 (S.I. 2008/1848)
 Army Terms of Service (Amendment etc.) Regulations 2008 (S.I. 2008/1849)
 Council Tax Limitation (Maximum Amounts) (England) Order 2008 (S.I. 2008/1850)
 Mental Capacity (Deprivation of Liberty: Standard Authorisations, Assessments and Ordinary Residence) Regulations 2008 (S.I. 2008/1858)
 East Kent Hospitals National Health Service Trust (Change of Name) (Establishment) Amendment Order 2008 (S.I. 2008/1859)
 Companies (Welsh Language Forms) (Amendment) Regulations 2008 (S.I. 2008/1860)
 Companies (Forms) (Amendment) Regulations 2008 (S.I. 2008/1861)
 Road Safety Act 2006 (Commencement No. 3) (England and Wales) Order 2008 (S.I. 2008/1862)
 Serious Crime Act 2007 (Appeals under Section 24) Order 2008 (S.I. 2008/1863)
 Road Safety Act 2006 (Commencement No. 3) Order 2008 (S.I. 2008/1864)
 Probate Services (Approved Bodies) Order 2008 (S.I. 2008/1865)
 School Budget Shares (Prescribed Purposes and Consequential Amendments) (Wales) Regulations 2008 (S.I. 2008/1866)
 King's Stanley CofE Primary School (Designation as having a Religious Character) Order 2008 (S.I. 2008/1867)
 Krishna-Avanti Primary School (Designation as having a Religious Character) Order 2008 (S.I. 2008/1868)
 Manor CE VC Primary School (Designation as having a Religious Character) Order 2008 (S.I. 2008/1869)
 Norham St Ceolwulfs CofE Controlled First School (Designation as having a Religious Character) Order 2008 (S.I. 2008/1870)
 St Saviour's Catholic Primary School (Designation as having a Religious Character) Order 2008 (S.I. 2008/1871)
 Thatcham Park Church of England Primary School (Designation as having a Religious Character) Order 2008 (S.I. 2008/1872)
 Towcester CofE Primary School (Designation as having a Religious Character) Order 2008 (S.I. 2008/1873)
 Arnot St Mary CE Primary School (Designation as having a Religious Character) Order 2008 (S.I. 2008/1874)
 All Saints CE (Aided) Primary School (Designation as having a Religious Character) Order 2008 (S.I. 2008/1875)
 Bellefield Primary and Nursery School (Designation as having a Religious Character) Order 2008 (S.I. 2008/1876)
 Local Involvement Networks (Amendment) Regulations 2008 (S.I. 2008/1877)
 Finance Act 2006, Section 28 (Appointed Day) Order 2008 (S.I. 2008/1878)
 Employment and Support Allowance (Consequential Provisions) (No. 3) Regulations 2008 (S.I. 2008/1879)
 Finance Act 2007, Section 50 (Appointed Day) Order 2008 (S.I. 2008/1880)
 Transmissible Spongiform Encephalopathies (England) Regulations 2008 (S.I. 2008/1881)
 Pensions Act 2004 (Code of Practice) (Dispute Resolution) Appointed Day Order 2008 (S.I. 2008/1882)
 Education (Specified Work and Registration) (England) (Amendment) Regulations 2008 (S.I. 2008/1883)
 General Teaching Council for England (Eligibility for Provisional Registration) Regulations 2008 (S.I. 2008/1884)
 Beer, Cider and Perry and Wine and Made–wine (Amendment) Regulations 2008 (S.I. 2008/1885)
 Companies Act 2006 (Commencement No. 7, Transitional Provisions and Savings) Order 2008 (S.I. 2008/1886)
 Police Pensions (Amendment) Regulations 2008 (S.I. 2008/1887)
 Origin of Renewables Electricity (Power of Gas and Electricity Markets Authority to act for Northern Ireland Authority for Utility Regulation) Regulations 2008 (S.I. 2008/1888)
 Housing (Scotland) Act 2006 (Consequential Provisions) Order 2008 (S.I. 2008/1889)
 Welsh Language Schemes (Public Bodies) Order 2008 (S.I. 2008/1890)
 Superannuation (Admission to Schedule 1 to the Superannuation Act 1972) Order 2008 (S.I. 2008/1891)
 Value Added Tax (Finance) Order 2008 (S.I. 2008/1892)
 Venture Capital Trust (Amendment) Regulations 2008 (S.I. 2008/1893)
 National Minimum Wage Regulations 1999 (Amendment) Regulations 2008 (S.I. 2008/1894)
 Civil Enforcement of Parking Contraventions (City and County of Swansea) Designation Order 2008 (S.I. 2008/1896)
 Companies (Trading Disclosures) (Insolvency) Regulations 2008 (S.I. 2008/1897)
 Gas and Electricity (Consumer Complaints Handling Standards) Regulations 2008 (S.I. 2008/1898)
 School Curriculum in Wales (Miscellaneous Amendments) Order 2008 (S.I. 2008/1899)
 Mental Health Act 2007 (Commencement No. 7 and Transitional Provisions) Order 2008 (S.I. 2008/1900)

1901-2000

 Representation of the People (Amendment) Regulations 2008 (S.I. 2008/1901)
 NHS Foundation Trusts (Trust Funds: Appointment of Trustees) Amendment Order 2008 (S.I. 2008/1902)
 Financial Assistance Scheme (Miscellaneous Amendments) Regulations 2008 (S.I. 2008/1903)
 Children Act 2004 (Commencement No. 8) (Wales) Order 2008 (S.I. 2008/1904)
 Insurance Companies (Corporation Tax Acts) (Amendment) Order 2008 (S.I. 2008/1905)
 Insurance Companies (Calculation of Profits: Policy Holders’ Tax) (Amendment) Regulations 2008 (S.I. 2008/1906)
 Whole of Government Accounts (Designation of Bodies) (No. 2) Order 2008 (S.I. 2008/1907)
 Serious Organised Crime and Police Act 2005 (Disclosure of Information by SOCA) Order 2008 (S.I. 2008/1908)
 Proceeds of Crime Act 2002 (Disclosure of Information) Order 2008 (S.I. 2008/1909)
 Limited Liability Partnerships (Accounts and Audit) (Application of Companies Act 2006) Regulations 2008 (S.I. 2008/1911)
 Small Limited Liability Partnerships (Accounts) Regulations 2008 (S.I. 2008/1912)
 Large and Medium-sized Limited Liability Partnerships (Accounts) Regulations 2008 (S.I. 2008/1913)
 European Parliamentary Elections (Returning Officers) Order 2008 (S.I. 2008/1914)
 Companies (Reduction of Share Capital) Order 2008 (S.I. 2008/1915)
 Capital Allowances (Energy-saving Plant and Machinery) (Amendment) Order 2008 (S.I. 2008/1916)
 Capital Allowances (Environmentally Beneficial Plant and Machinery) (Amendment) Order 2008 (S.I. 2008/1917)
 Road Safety Act 2006 (Commencement No. 4) Order 2008 (S.I. 2008/1918)
 Land Registration (Amendment) Rules 2008 (S.I. 2008/1919)
 Commonhold (Land Registration) (Amendment) Rules 2008 (S.I. 2008/1920)
 Land Registration (Proper Office) (Amendment) Order 2008 (S.I. 2008/1921)
 Water Act 2003 (Commencement No. 8) Order 2008 (S.I. 2008/1922)
 Insurance Companies (Taxation of Insurance Special Purpose Vehicles) Order 2008 (S.I. 2008/1923)
 Overseas Life Insurance Companies (Amendment) Regulations 2008 (S.I. 2008/1924)
 Finance Act 2008, Section 30 (Appointed Day) Order 2008 (S.I. 2008/1925)
 Financing-Arrangement-Funded Transfers to Shareholders Regulations 2008 (S.I. 2008/1926)
 Wildlife and Countryside Act 1981 (Variation of Schedule 5) (Wales) Order 2008 (S.I. 2008/1927)
 Finance Act 2008, Section 29 (Appointed Day) Order 2008 (S.I. 2008/1928)
 Finance Act 2008, Section 28 (Appointed Day) Order 2008 (S.I. 2008/1929)
 Finance Act 2008, Section 27 (Appointed Day) Order 2008 (S.I. 2008/1930)
 Terrorism Act 2000 (Proscribed Organisations) (Amendment) (No. 2) Order 2008 (S.I. 2008/1931)
 Stamp Duty Land Tax (Zero-Carbon Homes Relief) (Amendment) Regulations 2008 (S.I. 2008/1932)
 Finance Act 2008, Section 26 (Appointed Day) Order 2008 (S.I. 2008/1933)
 Individual Savings Account (Amendment No. 2) Regulations 2008 (S.I. 2008/1934)
 Finance Act 2008, Schedule 38, (Appointed Day) Order 2008 (S.I. 2008/1935)
 Finance Act 2008 Section 135 (Disaster or Emergency) Order 2008 (S.I. 2008/1936)
 Friendly Societies (Modification of the Corporation Tax Acts) (Amendment) Regulations 2008 (S.I. 2008/1937)
 Health Service Branded Medicines (Control of Prices and Supply of Information) Regulations 2008 (S.I. 2008/1938)
 Community Emissions Trading Scheme (Allocation of Allowances for Payment) (Amendment) Regulations 2008 (S.I. 2008/1939)
 General Optical Council (Therapeutics and Contact Lens Specialties) Rules Order of Council 2008 (S.I. 2008/1940)
 Producer Responsibility Obligations (Packaging Waste) (Amendment No. 2) Regulations 2008 (S.I. 2008/1941)
 Friendly Societies (Transfers of Other Business) (Modification of the Corporation Tax Acts) Regulations 2008 (S.I. 2008/1942)
 Air Navigation (Dangerous Goods) (Amendment) Regulations 2008 (S.I. 2008/1943)
 Insurance Companies (Taxation of Reinsurance Business) (Amendment) Regulations 2008 (S.I. 2008/1944)
 Insurance Premium Tax (Amendment) Regulations 2008 (S.I. 2008/1945)
 Registered Pension Schemes (Transfer of Sums and Assets) (Amendment) Regulations 2008 (S.I. 2008/1946)
 Tax Avoidance Schemes (Information) (Amendment) Regulations 2008 (S.I. 2008/1947)
 Taxes (Fees for Payment by Telephone) Regulations 2008 (S.I. 2008/1948)
 Gaming Duty (Amendment) Regulations 2008 (S.I. 2008/1949)
 Insurance Accounts Directive (Lloyd's Syndicate and Aggregate Accounts) Regulations 2008 (S.I. 2008/1950)
 A282 Trunk Road (Dartford-Thurrock Crossing Charging Scheme) Order 2008 (S.I. 2008/1951)
 Early Years Foundation Stage (Learning and Development Requirements) (Amendment) Order 2008 (S.I. 2008/1952)
 Early Years Foundation Stage (Welfare Requirements) (Amendment) Regulations 2008 (S.I. 2008/1953)
 European Parliament (Number of MEPs and Distribution between Electoral Regions) (United Kingdom and Gibraltar) Order 2008 (S.I. 2008/1954)
 Child Support Commissioners (Procedure) (Amendment) Regulations 2008 (S.I. 2008/1955)
 Road User Charging (Enforcement and Adjudication) (London) (Amendment) Regulations 2008 (S.I. 2008/1956)
 Social Security and Child Support (Decisions and Appeals) (Amendment) Regulations 2008 (S.I. 2008/1957)
 Trade Marks (Fees) Rules 2008 (S.I. 2008/1958)
 Community Trade Mark (Amendment) Regulations 2008 (S.I. 2008/1959)
 Commons Act 2006 (Commencement No. 4 and Savings) (England) Order 2008 (S.I. 2008/1960)
 Commons Registration (England) Regulations 2008 (S.I. 2008/1961)
 Dartmoor Commons (Authorised Severance) Order 2008 (S.I. 2008/1962)
 Mesothelioma Lump Sum Payments (Conditions and Amounts) Regulations 2008 (S.I. 2008/1963)
 Export Control (Democratic Republic of Congo) (Amendment) (No. 2) Order 2008 (S.I. 2008/1964)
 Vehicle Drivers (Certificates of Professional Competence) (Amendment) (No. 2) Regulations 2008 (S.I. 2008/1965)
 Maternity and Parental Leave etc. and the Paternity and Adoption Leave (Amendment) Regulations 2008 (S.I. 2008/1966)
 Freedom of Information (Parliament and National Assembly for Wales) Order 2008 (S.I. 2008/1967)
 Payments to the Churches Conservation Trust Order 2008 (S.I. 2008/1968)
 Legal Officers (Annual Fees) Order 2008 (S.I. 2008/1969)
 Ecclesiastical Judges, Legal Officers and Others (Fees) Order 2008 (S.I. 2008/1970)
 Education and Inspections Act 2006 (Commencement No. 7 and Transitional Provisions) Order 2008 (S.I. 2008/1971)
 Health Act 2006 (Commencement No. 5) Order 2008 (S.I. 2008/1972)
 Adventure Activities Licensing (Amendment) Regulations 2008 (S.I. 2008/1973)
 Northern Ireland (Sentences) Act 1998 (Specified Organisations) Order 2008 (S.I. 2008/1975)
 Private Dentistry (Wales) Regulations 2008 (S.I. 2008/1976)
 Crown Office Fees Order 2008 (S.I. 2008/1977)
 Proceeds of Crime Act 2002 (Investigative Powers of Prosecutors in England, Wales and Northern Ireland: Code of Practice) Order 2008 (S.I. 2008/1978)
 Personal and Occupational Pension Schemes (Amendment) Regulations 2008 (S.I. 2008/1979)
 Tractor etc. (EC Type-Approval) (Amendment) Regulations 2008 (S.I. 2008/1980)

2001-2100

 Non-Road Mobile Machinery (Emission of Gaseous and Particulate Pollutants) (Amendment) Regulations 2008 (S.I. 2008/2011)
 Child Maintenance and Other Payments Act 2008 (Commencement No. 2) Order 2008 (S.I. 2008/2033)
 Crossrail (Qualifying Authorities) Order 2008 (S.I. 2008/2034)
 Designation of Rural Primary Schools (England) Order 2008 (S.I. 2008/2035)
 Crossrail (Nomination) Order 2008 (S.I. 2008/2036)
 Greater London Authority Act 2007 (Commencement No. 5) Order 2008 (S.I. 2008/2037)
 London Waste and Recycling Board Order 2008 (S.I. 2008/2038)
 Criminal Justice Act 1988 (Offensive Weapons) (Amendment No. 2) Order 2008 (S.I. 2008/2039)
 Ministry of Defence Police Appeal Tribunals (Amendment) Regulations 2008 (S.I. 2008/2059)
 Milk and Milk Products (Pupils in Educational Establishments) (England) Regulations 2008 (S.I. 2008/2072)
 Criminal Procedure (Amendment) Rules 2008 (S.I. 2008/2076)
 Immigration (Supply of Information to the Secretary of State for Immigration Purposes) Order 2008 (S.I. 2008/2077)
 Christ The King Catholic and Church of England (VA) Centre For Learning (Designation as having a Religious Character) Order 2008 (S.I. 2008/2078)
 Canon Sharples Church of England Primary School and Nursery (Designation as having a Religious Character) Order 2008 (S.I. 2008/2079)
 Cleadon Village Church of England VA Primary School (Designation as having a Religious Character) Order 2008 (S.I. 2008/2080)
 Hackleton CofE Primary School (Designation as having a Religious Character) Order 2008 (S.I. 2008/2081)
 Hawthorn Church of England Controlled First School (Designation as having a Religious Character) Order 2008 (S.I. 2008/2082)
 Trinity Anglican-Methodist Primary School (Designation as having a Religious Character) Order 2008 (S.I. 2008/2083)
 Wylye Valley Church of England Voluntary Aided Primary School (Designation as having a Religious Character) Order 2008 (S.I. 2008/2084)
 St Gregory's Catholic Primary School (Designation as having a Religious Character) Order 2008 (S.I. 2008/2085)
 International Development Association (Multilateral Debt Relief Initiative) (Amendment) Order 2008 (S.I. 2008/2086)
 Canon Peter Hall CofE Primary School (Designation as having a Religious Character) Order 2008 (S.I. 2008/2087)
 African Development Bank (Eleventh Replenishment of the African Development Fund) Order 2008 (S.I. 2008/2088)
 African Development Fund (Multilateral Debt Relief Initiative) (Amendment) Order 2008 (S.I. 2008/2089)
 International Development Association (Fifteenth Replenishment) Order 2008 (S.I. 2008/2090)
 Concessionary Bus Travel (Permits) (England) (Amendment) Regulations 2008 (S.I. 2008/2091)
 All Saints CofE School (Designation as having a Religious Character) Order 2008 (S.I. 2008/2092)
 Town and Country Planning (Environmental Impact Assessment) (Amendment) (England) Regulations 2008 (S.I. 2008/2093)
 Education (Student Support) (Amendment) (No. 2) Regulations 2008 (S.I. 2008/2094)
 Removal, Storage and Disposal of Vehicles (Prescribed Sums and Charges) Regulations 2008 (S.I. 2008/2095)
 Police (Retention and Disposal of Motor Vehicles) (Amendment) Regulations 2008 (S.I. 2008/2096)
 Road Traffic Act 1988 (Retention and Disposal of Seized Motor Vehicles) (Amendment) Regulations 2008 (S.I. 2008/2097)
 Judicial Discipline (Prescribed Procedures) (Amendment) Regulations 2008 (S.I. 2008/2098)
 School Teachers’ Incentive Payments (England) Order 2008 (S.I. 2008/2099)

2101-2200

 Welfare Reform Act 2007 (Commencement No. 7, Transitional and Savings Provisions) Order 2008 (S.I. 2008/2101)
 Dartmouth-Kingswear Floating Bridge (Vehicle Classifications & Revision of Charges) Order 2008 (S.I. 2008/2102)
 Vaccine Damage Payments (Specified Disease) Order 2008 (S.I. 2008/2103)
 Wireless Telegraphy (Register) (Amendment) (No. 2) Regulations 2008 (S.I. 2008/2104)
 Wireless Telegraphy (Spectrum Trading) (Amendment) (No. 2) Regulations 2008 (S.I. 2008/2105)
 Wireless Telegraphy (Licence Charges) (Amendment) (No. 2) Regulations 2008 (S.I. 2008/2106)
 A421 Trunk Road (M1 Junction 13 to Bedford Improvements and Detrunking) Order 2008 (S.I. 2008/2107)
 Export and Import of Dangerous Chemicals Regulations 2008 (S.I. 2008/2108)
 A421 Trunk Road(M1 Junction 13 Improvements) Order 2008 (S.I. 2008/2109)
 M1 Motorway (Junction 13 and Connecting Roads) Order 2008 (S.I. 2008/2110)
 Social Security (Child Maintenance Amendments) Regulations 2008 (S.I. 2008/2111)
 Social Security (Use of Information for Housing Benefit and Welfare Services Purposes) Regulations 2008 (S.I. 2008/2112)
 Local Government (Structural Changes) (Transitional Arrangements) Regulations 2008 (S.I. 2008/2113)
 Welfare Reform Act (Relevant Enactment) Order 2008 (S.I. 2008/2114)
 Assembly Learning Grants and Loans (Higher Education) (Wales) (Amendment) Regulations 2008 (S.I. 2008/2140)
 School Milk (Wales) Regulations 2008 (S.I. 2008/2141)
 Transport Tribunal (Amendment) Rules 2008 (S.I. 2008/2142)
 Police Act 1997 (Criminal Records) (Amendment) Regulations 2008 (S.I. 2008/2143)
 Education (School Teachers’ Pay and Conditions) Order 2008 (S.I. 2008/2155)
 Crime (International Co-operation) Act 2003 (Designation of Participating Countries) (England, Wales and Northern Ireland) Order 2008 (S.I. 2008/2156)
 Offshore Installations (Safety Zones) (No. 2) Order 2008 (S.I. 2008/2157)
 Disability Discrimination (General Qualifications Bodies)(Relevant Qualifications, Reasonable Steps and Physical Features)(Amendment) Regulations 2008 (S.I. 2008/2159)
 Armed Forces and Reserve Forces (Compensation Scheme) (Amendment No. 2) Order 2008 (S.I. 2008/2160)
 Enterprise Act 2002 (Bodies Designated to make Super-complaints) (Amendment) Order 2008 (S.I. 2008/2161)
 Planning and Compulsory Purchase Act 2004 (Commencement No.4 and Consequential, Transitional and Savings Provisions) (Wales) (Amendment No. 2) Order 2008 (S.I. 2008/2162)
 Crime and Disorder Act 1998 (Responsible Authorities) Order 2008 (S.I. 2008/2163)
 Batteries and Accumulators (Placing on the Market) Regulations 2008 (S.I. 2008/2164)
 Merchant Shipping and Fishing Vessels (Provision and Use of Work Equipment) (Amendment) Regulations 2008 (S.I. 2008/2165)
 Merchant Shipping and Fishing Vessels (Lifting Operations and Lifting Equipment) (Amendment) Regulations 2008 (S.I. 2008/2166)
 Excise Duties (Road Fuel Gas) (Reliefs) Regulations 2008 (S.I. 2008/2167)
 Excise Duties (Surcharges or Rebates) (Hydrocarbon Oils etc.) Order 2008 (S.I. 2008/2168)
 Tax Credits (Miscellaneous Amendments) (No. 2) Regulations 2008 (S.I. 2008/2169)
 Income Tax (Qualifying Child Care) Regulations 2008 (S.I. 2008/2170)
 Dartford-Thurrock Crossing (Amendment) Regulations 2008 (S.I. 2008/2171)
 Conservation (Natural Habitats, &c.) (Amendment) (England and Wales) Regulations 2008 (S.I. 2008/2172)
 Cosmetic Products (Safety) (Amendment) Regulations 2008 (S.I. 2008/2173)
 Crossrail (Fees for Requests for Planning Approval) Regulations 2008 (S.I. 2008/2175)
 Local Government (Structural Changes) (Transfer of Functions, Property, Rights and Liabilities) Regulations 2008 (S.I. 2008/2176)
 Traffic Signs (Amendment) Regulations and General Directions 2008 (S.I. 2008/2177)
 Civil Procedure (Amendment) Rules 2008 (S.I. 2008/2178)

2201-2300

 Trade Marks (International Registration) Order 2008 (S.I. 2008/2206)
 Trade Marks (Fees) Revocation Rules 2008 (S.I. 2008/2207)
 Health and Social Care Act 2008 (Commencement No.1) Order 2008 (S.I. 2008/2214)
 Health and Social Care Act 2008 (Consequential Amendments and Transitory Provisions) Order 2008 (S.I. 2008/2250)
 National Health Service (Charges to Overseas Visitors) (Amendment) Regulations 2008 (S.I. 2008/2251)
 Care Quality Commission (Membership) Regulations 2008 (S.I. 2008/2252)
 A1 Motorway (Dishforth to Barton Section and Connecting Roads) Scheme 2008 (S.I. 2008/2253)
 A1 Trunk Road (Dishforth to Barton) (Detrunking) Order 2008 (S.I. 2008/2254)
 Public Contracts and Utilities Contracts (CPV Code Amendments) Regulations 2008 (S.I. 2008/2256)
 Town and Country Planning (Trees) (Amendment) (England) Regulations 2008 (S.I. 2008/2260)
 Childcare Act 2006 (Commencement No. 5 and Savings and Transitional Provisions) Order 2008 (S.I. 2008/2261)
 A1(M) Motorway and the M62 Motorway (Holmfield Interchange Link Roads) (Speed Limit) Regulations 2008 (S.I. 2008/2262)
 National Health Service Pension Scheme and Injury Benefits (Amendment) Regulations 2008 (S.I. 2008/2263)
 Tonnage Tax (Training Requirement) (Amendment) Regulations 2008 (S.I. 2008/2264)
 Social Fund (Applications and Miscellaneous Provisions) Regulations 2008 (S.I. 2008/2265)
 Vehicle Excise Duty (Immobilisation, Removal and Disposal of Vehicles) (Amendment) Regulations 2008 (S.I. 2008/2266)
 Postal Services Regulated Providers (Redress Scheme) Order 2008 (S.I. 2008/2267)
 Gas and Electricity Regulated Providers (Redress Scheme) Order 2008 (S.I. 2008/2268)
 Transmissible Spongiform Encephalopathies (Fees) (England) Regulations 2008 (S.I. 2008/2269)
 Zoonoses and Animal By-Products (Fees) (England) Regulations 2008 (S.I. 2008/2270)
 Veterinary Medicines Regulations 2008 (S.I. 2008/2297)
 Housing Benefit and Council Tax Benefit (Amendment) Regulations 2008 (S.I. 2008/2299)
 Trade Marks (Amendment) Rules 2008 (S.I. 2008/2300)

2301-2400

 Pensions Act 2007 (Actuarial Guidance) (Consequential Provisions) Order 2008 (S.I. 2008/2301)
 Finance Act 1998, Schedule 2 (Assessments in Respect of Drawback) (Appointed Day) Order 2008 (S.I. 2008/2302)
 Health and Safety (Enforcing Authority for Railways and Other Guided Transport Systems) (Amendment) Regulations 2008 (S.I. 2008/2323)
 Valuation for Rating (Plant and Machinery) (England) (Amendment) Regulations 2008 (S.I. 2008/2332)
 Non-Domestic Rating (Communications Hereditaments) (Valuation, Alteration of Lists and Appeals and Material Day) (England) Regulations 2008 (S.I. 2008/2333)
 Building (Electronic Communications) Order 2008 (S.I. 2008/2334)
 Town and Country Planning (Environmental Impact Assessment) (Amendment) (Wales) Regulations 2008 (S.I. 2008/2335)
 Town and Country Planning (General Development Procedure) (Amendment) (Wales) Order 2008 (S.I. 2008/2336)
 Chemicals (Hazard Information and Packaging for Supply) (Amendment) Regulations 2008 (S.I. 2008/2337)
 Stamp Duty Land Tax (Variation of Part 4 of the Finance Act 2003) Regulations 2008 (S.I. 2008/2338)
 Stamp Duty Land Tax (Exemption of Certain Acquisitions of Residential Property) Regulations 2008 (S.I. 2008/2339)
 Designation of Schools Having a Religious Character (Independent Schools) (England) (No. 2) Order 2008 (S.I. 2008/2340)
 Legal Services Act 2007 (Transitional, Savings and Consequential Provisions) (Scotland) Order 2008 (S.I. 2008/2341)
 Smoke Control Areas (Authorised Fuels) (England) (Amendment) Regulations 2008 (S.I. 2008/2342)
 Smoke Control Areas (Exempted Fireplaces) (England) (No. 2) Order 2008 (S.I. 2008/2343)
 Civil Enforcement of Parking Contraventions (County of Buckinghamshire) (District of Wycombe) Designation Order 2008 (S.I. 2008/2344)
 Housing (Approval of a Code of Management Practice) (Student Accommodation) (England) Order 2008 (S.I. 2008/2345)
 Houses in Multiple Occupation (Specified Educational Establishments) (England) Regulations 2008 (S.I. 2008/2346)
 Sea Fishing (Recovery Measures) Order 2008 (S.I. 2008/2347)
 Nitrate Pollution Prevention Regulations 2008 (S.I. 2008/2349)
 A465 Trunk Road (Llangua Bridge to A49/A465 Belmont Roundabout) (Detrunking) Order 2008 (S.I. 2008/2350)
 Private and Voluntary Health Care (England) Amendment Regulations 2008 (S.I. 2008/2352)
 Serious Crime Act 2007 (Specified Anti-fraud Organisations) Order 2008 (S.I. 2008/2353)
 Postal Services (Consumer Complaints Handling Standards) Regulations 2008 (S.I. 2008/2355)
 Wildlife and Countryside Act 1981 (Variation of Schedule 4) (England) Order 2008 (S.I. 2008/2356)
 Wildlife and Countryside (Registration and Ringing of Certain Captive Birds) (Amendment) (England) Regulations 2008 (S.I. 2008/2357)
 Housing and Regeneration Act 2008 (Commencement No. 1 and Transitional Provision) Order 2008 (S.I. 2008/2358)
 Harwich Haven Harbour Revision Order 2008 (S.I. 2008/2359)
 Fal & Helford Designated Area (Fishing Restrictions) Order 2008 (S.I. 2008/2360)
 Housing (Right to Manage) (England) Regulations 2008 (S.I. 2008/2361)
 Town and Country Planning (General Permitted Development) (Amendment) (No. 2) (England) Order 2008 (S.I. 2008/2362)
 Energy Performance of Buildings (Certificates and Inspections) (England and Wales) (Amendment No.2) Regulations 2008 (S.I. 2008/2363)
 National Health Service (Charges to Overseas Visitors) (Amendment) (Wales) Regulations 2008 (S.I. 2008/2364)
 Social Security (Miscellaneous Amendments) (No. 3) Regulations 2008 (S.I. 2008/2365)
 Channel Tunnel (International Arrangements) (Amendment) Order 2008 (S.I. 2008/2366)
 Removal and Disposal of Vehicles (Traffic Officers) (England) Regulations 2008 (S.I. 2008/2367)
 Mental Capacity (Deprivation of Liberty: Appointment of Relevant Person's Representative) (Amendment) Regulations 2008 (S.I. 2008/2368)
 Disabled Facilities Grants (Maximum Amounts and Additional Purposes) (Wales) Order 2008 (S.I. 2008/2370)
 Regulatory Enforcement and Sanctions Act 2008 (Commencement No 1) Order 2008 (S.I. 2008/2371)
 Sale of Registration Marks (Amendment) Regulations 2008 (S.I. 2008/2372)
 Gas (Applications for Licences and Extensions and Restrictions of Licences) Regulations 2008 (S.I. 2008/2375)
 Electricity (Applications for Licences, Modifications of an Area and Extensions and Restrictions of Licences) Regulations 2008 (S.I. 2008/2376)
 Housing Renewal Grants (Amendment) (Wales) Regulations 2008 (S.I. 2008/2377)

2401-2500

 Plant Health (England) (Amendment) Order 2008 (S.I. 2008/2411)
 Social Security (Miscellaneous Amendments) (No.4) Regulations 2008 (S.I. 2008/2424)
 Local Government Pension Scheme (Miscellaneous) Regulations 2008 (S.I. 2008/2425)
 Wireless Telegraphy (Exemption) (Amendment) (No. 2) Regulations 2008 (S.I. 2008/2426)
 Wireless Telegraphy (Mobile Communication Services on Aircraft - MCA) (Exemption) Regulations 2008 (S.I. 2008/2427)
 Employment and Support Allowance (Miscellaneous Amendments) Regulations 2008 (S.I. 2008/2428)
 Air Navigation (Dangerous Goods) (Amendment) (No. 2) Regulations 2008 (S.I. 2008/2429)
 Criminal Defence Service (Recovery of Defence Costs Orders) (Amendment) Regulations 2008 (S.I. 2008/2430)
 Dudley and Walsall Mental Health Partnership National Health Service Trust (Establishment) Order 2008 (S.I. 2008/2431)
 Local Government and Public Involvement in Health Act 2007 (Commencement No.7) Order 2008 (S.I. 2008/2434)
 Isle of Wight (Electoral Changes) Order 2008 (S.I. 2008/2435)
 Mental Health (Approval of Persons to be Approved Mental Health Professionals) (Wales) Regulations 2008 (S.I. 2008/2436)
 Mental Health (Independent Mental Health Advocates) (Wales) Regulations 2008 (S.I. 2008/2437)
 Abertawe Bro Morgannwg University National Health Service Trust (Transfer of Property, Rights and Liabilities) Order 2008 (S.I. 2008/2438)
 Mental Health (Hospital, Guardianship, Community Treatment and Consent to Treatment) (Wales) Regulations 2008 (S.I. 2008/2439)
 Mental Health (Conflicts of Interest) (Wales) Regulations 2008 (S.I. 2008/2440)
 Mental Health (Nurses) (Wales) Order 2008 (S.I. 2008/2441)
 Civil Enforcement of Parking Contraventions (County of East Sussex) (Borough of Eastbourne) Designation Order 2008 (S.I. 2008/2442)
 North Wales National Health Service Trust (Transfer of Property, Rights and Liabilities) Order 2008 (S.I. 2008/2443)
 Consumer Credit Act 2006 (Commencement No. 4 and Transitional Provisions) (Amendment) Order 2008 (S.I. 2008/2444)
 Infant Formula and Follow-on Formula (England) (Amendment) Regulations 2008 (S.I. 2008/2445)
 Family Proceedings (Amendment) Rules 2008 (S.I. 2008/2446)
 Family Procedure (Adoption) (Amendment) Rules 2008 (S.I. 2008/2447)
 Costs in Criminal Cases (General) (Amendment) Regulations 2008 (S.I. 2008/2448)
 Primary Ophthalmic Services and National Health Service (Optical Charges and Payments) Amendment Regulations 2008 (S.I. 2008/2449)
 Occupational and Personal Pension Schemes (Transfer Values) (Amendment) Regulations 2008 (S.I. 2008/2450)
 Offshore Installations (Safety Zones) (No.3) Order 2008 (S.I. 2008/2454)
 Parochial Fees Order 2008 (S.I. 2008/2470)
 National Health Service (Directions by Strategic Health Authorities to Primary Care Trusts Regarding Arrangements for Involvement) Regulations 2008 (S.I. 2008/2496)
 Health and Social Care Act 2008 (Commencement No.2) Order 2008 (S.I. 2008/2497)
 Non-Domestic Rating (Unoccupied Property) (Wales) Regulations 2008 (S.I. 2008/2499)
 Common Agricultural Policy Single Payment and Support Schemes (Wales) (Amendment) Regulations 2008 (S.I. 2008/2500)

2501-2600

 Veterinary Surgeons (Examination of Commonwealth and Foreign Candidates) (Amendment) Regulations Order of Council 2008 (S.I. 2008/2501)
 A4123 Trunk Road (Sandwell and Dudley) (Detrunking) Order 2008 (S.I. 2008/2502)
 Police and Justice Act 2006 (Commencement No. 9) Order 2008 (S.I. 2008/2503)
 Serious Crime Act 2007 (Commencement No. 3) Order 2008 (S.I. 2008/2504)
 Student Fees (Amounts) (England) (Amendment) Regulations 2008 (S.I. 2008/2507)
 Motor Vehicles (Driving Licences) (Amendment) (No. 5) Regulations 2008 (S.I. 2008/2508)
 A570 Trunk Road (North of M58 to the Lancashire County Boundary) (Detrunking) Order 2008 (S.I. 2008/2510)
 A570 Trunk Road (Lancashire County Boundary to the Kew roundabout) (Detrunking) Order 2008 (S.I. 2008/2511)
 Felixstowe Branch Line and Ipswich Yard Improvement Order 2008 (S.I. 2008/2512)
 Child Support (Consequential Provisions) Regulations 2008 (S.I. 2008/2543)
 Child Support (Miscellaneous Amendments) (No. 2) Regulations 2008 (S.I. 2008/2544)
 Child Support, Pensions and Social Security Act 2000 (Commencement No. 14) Order 2008 (S.I. 2008/2545)
 Bradford & Bingley plc Transfer of Securities and Property etc. Order 2008 (S.I. 2008/2546)
 Value Added Tax (Finance) (No. 2) Order 2008 (S.I. 2008/2547)
 Child Maintenance and Other Payments Act 2008 (Commencement No. 3 and Transitional and Savings Provisions) Order 2008 (S.I. 2008/2548)
 Pollution Prevention and Control (Designation of Directives) (England and Wales) Order 2008 (S.I. 2008/2549)
 Consumers, Estate Agents and Redress Act 2007 (Commencement No. 5 and Savings and Transitional Provisions) Order 2008 (S.I. 2008/2550)
 Child Support Information Regulations 2008 (S.I. 2008/2551)
 National Health Service (General Ophthalmic Services) and (Optical Charges and Payments) (Amendment) (Wales) Regulations 2008 (S.I. 2008/2552)
 Nursing and Midwifery Council (Constitution) Order 2008 (S.I. 2008/2553)
 General Medical Council (Constitution) Order 2008 (S.I. 2008/2554)
 Health Care and Associated Professions (Miscellaneous Amendments) Order 2008 (Commencement No. 1) Order of Council 2008 (S.I. 2008/2556)
 Digital Switchover (Disclosure of Information) Act 2007 (Prescription of Information) (Amendment) Order 2008 (S.I. 2008/2557)
 National Information Governance Board Regulations 2008 (S.I. 2008/2558)
 Mental Health (Hospital, Guardianship and Treatment) (England) (Amendment) Regulations 2008 (S.I. 2008/2560)
 Mental Health Act 2007 (Commencement No. 8 and Transitional Provisions) Order 2008 (S.I. 2008/2561)
 Air Navigation (Jersey) Order 2008 (S.I. 2008/2562)
 Inspectors of Education, Children's Services and Skills (No. 4) Order 2008 (S.I. 2008/2563)
 European Communities (Designation) (No. 3) Order 2008 (S.I. 2008/2564)
 Cosmetic Products (Safety) (Amendment No. 2) Regulations 2008 (S.I. 2008/2566)
 Civil Enforcement of Parking Contraventions (The County Council of Durham) (Durham District) Designation Order 2008 (S.I. 2008/2567)
 National Health Service (Travelling Expenses and Remission of Charges) (Wales) (Amendment)(No.2) Regulations 2008 (S.I. 2008/2568)
 Social Fund Cold Weather Payments (General) Amendment Regulations 2008 (S.I. 2008/2569)
 Pesticides (Maximum Residue Levels) (England and Wales) Regulations 2008 (S.I. 2008/2570)
 National Health Service (Charges for Drugs and Appliances) Amendment Regulations 2008 (S.I. 2008/2593)
 Constitutional Reform Act 2005 (Commencement No. 10) Order 2008 (S.I. 2008/2597)
 Genetically Modified Organisms (England) (Amendments) Regulations 2008 (S.I. 2008/2598)
 Hydrocarbon Oil and Bioblend (Private Pleasure-flying and Private Pleasure Craft) (Payment of Rebate etc.) Regulations 2008 (S.I. 2008/2599)
 Hydrocarbon Oil (Supply of Rebated Heavy Oil) (Payment of Rebate) Regulations 2008 (S.I. 2008/2600)

2601-2700

 The Income Tax (Pay As You Earn) (Amendment) (No.2) Regulations 2008 (S.I. 2008/2601)
 The Taxation of Benefits under Government Pilot Schemes (Better off in Work Credit) Order 2008 (S.I. 2008/2603)
 The Insurance Companies (Overseas Life Assurance Business) (Excluded Business) (Amendment) Regulations 2008 (S.I. 2008/2625)
 The Overseas Insurers (Tax Representatives) (Amendment) Regulations 2008 (S.I. 2008/2626)
 The Insurance Companies (Overseas Life Assurance Business) (Compliance) (Amendment) Regulations 2008 (S.I. 2008/2627)
 The Life Assurance and Other Policies (Keeping of Information and Duties of Insurers) (Amendment) Regulations 2008 (S.I. 2008/2628)
 The Police and Criminal Evidence Act 1984 (Codes of Practice) (Revisions to Code A) Order 2008 (S.I. 2008/2638)
 The Statutory Auditors and Third Country Auditors (Amendment) (No. 2) Regulations 2008 (S.I. 2008/2639)
 The Non-resident Companies (General Insurance Business) (Amendment) Regulations 2008 (S.I. 2008/2643)
 The Enterprise Act 2002 (Specification of Additional Section 58 Consideration) Order 2008 (S.I. 2008/2645)
 The Group Relief for Overseas Losses (Modification of the Corporation Tax Acts for Non-resident Insurance Companies) Regulations 2008 (S.I. 2008/2646)
 The European Single Currency (Taxes) (Amendment) Regulations 2008 (S.I. 2008/2647)
 The Veterinary Medicines (Amendment) Regulations 2008 (S.I. 2008/2648)
 The Corporation Tax (Instalment Payments) (Amendment) Regulations 2008 (S.I. 2008/2649)
 The Child Support (Consequential Provisions) (No. 2) Regulations 2008 (S.I. 2008/2656)
 The Special Educational Needs (Information) Act 2008 (Commencement) Order 2008 (S.I. 2008/2664)
 The Social Security (Miscellaneous Amendments) (No. 5) Regulations 2008 (S.I. 2008/2667)
 The Landsbanki Freezing Order 2008 (S.I. 2008/2668)
 The Landfill Tax (Material from Contaminated Land) (Phasing out of Exemption) Order 2008 (S.I. 2008/2669)
 The Insurance Companies (Taxation of Reinsurance Business) (Amendment) (No. 2) Regulations 2008 (S.I. 2008/2670)
 The Financial Services and Markets Act 2000 (Consequential Amendments) (Taxes) Order 2008 (S.I. 2008/2673)
 The Child Maintenance and Other Payments Act 2008 (Commencement No. 4 and Transitional Provision) Order 2008 (S.I. 2008/2675)
 The Value Added Tax (Reduced Rate) (Supplies of Domestic Fuel or Power) Order 2008 (S.I. 2008/2676)
 The National Health Service (Directions by Strategic Health Authorities to Primary Care Trusts Regarding Arrangements for Involvement) (No.2) Regulations 2008 (S.I. 2008/2677)
 The National Insurance Contributions (Application of Part 7 of the Finance Act 2004) (Amendment) Regulations 2008 (S.I. 2008/2678)
 The Insurance Companies (Reserves) (Tax) (Amendment) Regulations 2008 (S.I. 2008/2679)
 The Legal Services Act 2007 (Prescribed Charity) Order 2008 (S.I. 2008/2680)
 The Double Taxation Relief (Surrender of Relievable Tax Within a Group) (Amendment) Regulations 2008 (S.I. 2008/2681)
 The Income Tax (Deposit-takers and Building Societies) (Interest Payments) Regulations 2008 (S.I. 2008/2682)
 The Tribunals, Courts and Enforcement Act 2007 (Transitional and Consequential Provisions) Order 2008 (S.I. 2008/2683)
 The First-tier Tribunal and Upper Tribunal (Chambers) Order 2008 (S.I. 2008/2684)
 The Tribunal Procedure (First-tier Tribunal) (Social Entitlement Chamber) Rules 2008 (S.I. 2008/2685)
 The Tribunal Procedure (First-tier Tribunal) (War Pensions and Armed Forces Compensation Chamber) Rules 2008 (S.I. 2008/2686)
 The Income Tax (Interest Payments) (Information Powers) (Amendment) Regulations 2008 (S.I. 2008/2688)
 The General Optical Council (Fitness to Practise) (Amendment in Relation to Standard of Proof) Rules Order of Council 2008 (S.I. 2008/2690)
 The Qualifications for Appointment of Members to the First-tier Tribunal and Upper Tribunal Order 2008 (S.I. 2008/2692)
 The Amusement Machine Licence Duty, etc. (Amendments) Regulations 2008 (S.I. 2008/2693)
 The Sustainable Communities Regulations 2008 (S.I. 2008/2694)
 The Tribunals, Courts and Enforcement Act 2007 (Commencement No. 6 and Transitional Provisions) Order 2008 (S.I. 2008/2696)
 The Tribunals, Courts and Enforcement Act 2007 (Transitional Judicial Pensions Provisions) Regulations 2008 (S.I. 2008/2697)
 The Tribunal Procedure (Upper Tribunal) Rules 2008 (S.I. 2008/2698)
 The Tribunal Procedure (First-tier Tribunal) (Health, Education and Social Care Chamber) Rules 2008 (S.I. 2008/2699)
 The Discipline of Judges (Designation) Order 2008 (S.I. 2008/2700)

2701-2800

 The Economic Regulation of Airports (Designation) Order (Amendment) Order 2008 (S.I. 2008/2702)
 The Community Legal Service (Financial) (Amendment No. 2) Regulations 2008 (S.I. 2008/2703)
 The Community Legal Service (Funding) (Amendment No. 2) Order 2008 (S.I. 2008/2704)
 The Mental Health Review Tribunal for Wales Rules 2008 (S.I. 2008/2705)
 The Mesothelioma Lump Sum Payments (Claims and Reconsiderations) (Amendment) Regulations 2008 (S.I. 2008/2706)
 The Appeals (Excluded Decisions) Order 2008 (S.I. 2008/2707)
 The Agricultural Holdings (Units of Production) (England) Order 2008 (S.I. 2008/2708)
 The Criminal Justice and Immigration Act 2008 (Commencement No. 3 and Transitional Provisions) Order 2008 (S.I. 2008/2712)
 The Bail (Electronic Monitoring of Requirements) (Responsible Officer) Order 2008 (S.I. 2008/2713)
 The Health Act 2006 (Commencement No. 6) Order 2008 (S.I. 2008/2714)
 The Education (Student Loans) (Repayment) (Amendment) (No. 2) Regulations 2008 (S.I. 2008/2715)
 The Health and Social Care Act 2008 (Commencement No. 3) Order 2008 (S.I. 2008/2717)
 The Plant Health (England) (Amendment) (No. 2) Order 2008 (S.I. 2008/2765)
 The Landsbanki Freezing (Amendment) Order 2008 (S.I. 2008/2766)
 The Social Security (Miscellaneous Amendments) (No.6) Regulations 2008 (S.I. 2008/2767)
 The Criminal Justice (Sentencing) (Curfew Condition) Order 2008 (S.I. 2008/2768)
 The NHS Direct National Health Service Trust (Establishment) Amendment Order 2008 (S.I. 2008/2769)
 The Employment Tribunals (Constitution and Rules of Procedure) (Amendment) Regulations 2008 (S.I. 2008/2771)
 The Welfare Reform Act 2007 (Commencement No. 8) Order 2008 (S.I. 2008/2772)
 The Eccles College and Salford College (Dissolution) Order 2008 (S.I. 2008/2773)
 The Protection of Wrecks (Designation) (England) Order 2008 (S.I. 2008/2775)
 The Fixed-term Employees (Prevention of Less Favourable Treatment) (Amendment) Regulations 2008 (S.I. 2008/2776)
 The Stamp Duty and Stamp Duty Reserve Tax (Investment Exchanges and Clearing Houses) Regulations 2008 (S.I. 2008/2777)
 The Forced Marriage (Civil Protection) Act 2007 (Commencement No.1) Order 2008 (S.I. 2008/2779)
 The Appeals (Excluded Decisions) (Amendment) Order 2008 (S.I. 2008/2780)
 The Employment and Support Allowance (Transitional Provisions) (Amendment) Regulations 2008 (S.I. 2008/2783)
 The South Devon Healthcare NHS Foundation Trust (Transfer of Trust Property) Order 2008 (S.I. 2008/2784)
 The Police and Justice Act 2006 (Commencement No. 10) Order 2008 (S.I. 2008/2785)
 The Bradford District Care Trust (Transfer of Trust Property) Order 2008 (S.I. 2008/2786)
 The Local Authorities (Functions and Responsibilities) (England) (Amendment No. 3) Regulations 2008 (S.I. 2008/2787)
 The Mental Health Act 2007 (Commencement No.9) Order 2008 (S.I. 2008/2788)
 The Medicines (Pharmacies) (Responsible Pharmacist) Regulations 2008 (S.I. 2008/2789)
 The Immigration and Nationality (Cost Recovery Fees) (Amendment No. 3) Regulations 2008 (S.I. 2008/2790)
 The Contracting Out (Administrative and Other Court Staff) (Amendment) Order 2008 (S.I. 2008/2791)
 The Appointments Commission (Amendment) Regulations 2008 (S.I. 2008/2792)
 The Remand on Bail (Disapplication of Credit Period) Rules 2008 (S.I. 2008/2793)
 The 3400–3800 MHz Frequency Band (Management) Regulations 2008 (S.I. 2008/2794)
 The Cat and Dog Fur (Control of Import, Export and Placing on the Market) Regulations 2008 (S.I. 2008/2795)

2801-2900
 The A27 Trunk Road (Southerham to Beddingham Improvement) (Derestriction and Revocation) Order 2008 (S.I. 2008/2820)
 The A27 Trunk Road (Southerham to Beddingham Improvement) (Banned Turns) Order 2008 (S.I. 2008/2821)
 The UK Borders Act 2007 (Commencement No. 4) Order 2008 (S.I. 2008/2822)
 The Housing Benefit and Council Tax Benefit (Amendment) (No. 2) Regulations 2008 (S.I. 2008/2824)
 The Legislative Reform (Consumer Credit) Order 2008 (S.I. 2008/2826)
 The Mental Health Act 2007 (Consequential Amendments) Order 2008 (S.I. 2008/2828)
 The Gambling Act 2005 (Advertising of Foreign Gambling) (Amendment) (No.2) Regulations 2008 (S.I. 2008/2829)
 The Immigration (Biometric Registration) (Objection to Civil Penalty) Order 2008 (S.I. 2008/2830)
 The Housing and Regeneration Act 2008 (Consequential Provisions) (No. 2) Order 2008 (S.I. 2008/2831)
 The Excise Warehousing (Etc.) (Amendment) Regulations 2008 (S.I. 2008/2832)
 The Transfer of Tribunal Functions Order 2008 (S.I. 2008/2833)
 The Appeals from the Upper Tribunal to the Court of Appeal Order 2008 (S.I. 2008/2834)
 The First-tier Tribunal and Upper Tribunal (Composition of Tribunal) Order 2008 (S.I. 2008/2835)
 The Allocation and Transfer of Proceedings Order 2008 (S.I. 2008/2836)
 The Transfer of Housing Corporation Functions (Modifications and Transitional Provisions) Order 2008 (S.I. 2008/2839)
 The Legislative Reform (Local Authority Consent Requirements) (England and Wales) Order 2008 (S.I. 2008/2840)
 The Cremation (England and Wales) Regulations 2008 (S.I. 2008/2841)
 The Motor Vehicles (EC Type Approval) (Amendment) Regulations 2008 (S.I. 2008/2844)
 The Falkland Islands Constitution Order 2008 (S.I. 2008/2846)
 The Statistics of Trade (Customs and Excise) (Amendment) (No. 2) Regulations 2008 (S.I. 2008/2847)
 The Public Contracts and Utilities Contracts (Postal Services Amendments) Regulations 2008 (S.I. 2008/2848)
 The Road Vehicles (Registration and Licensing) (Amendment No. 3) Regulations 2008 (S.I. 2008/2849)
 The Retention of Registration Marks (Amendment) Regulations 2008 (S.I. 2008/2850)
 The Merchant Shipping (Training and Certification) (Amendment) Regulations 2008 (S.I. 2008/2851)
 The REACH Enforcement Regulations 2008 (S.I. 2008/2852)
 The Civil Proceedings Fees (Amendment) Order 2008 (S.I. 2008/2853)
 The Non-Contentious Probate Fees (Amendment) Order 2008 (S.I. 2008/2854)
 The Magistrates’ Courts Fees (Amendment) Order 2008 (S.I. 2008/2855)
 The Family Proceedings Fees (Amendment) Order 2008 (S.I. 2008/2856)
 The Local Elections (Ordinary Day of Elections in 2009) Order 2008 (S.I. 2008/2857)
 The Family Proceedings Courts (Children Act 1989) (Amendment) Rules 2008 (S.I. 2008/2858)
 The Magistrates’ Courts (Enforcement of Children Act 1989 Contact Orders) Rules 2008 (S.I. 2008/2859)
 The Companies Act 2006 (Commencement No. 8, Transitional Provisions and Savings) Order 2008 (S.I. 2008/2860)
 The Family Proceedings (Amendment) (No.2) Rules 2008 (S.I. 2008/2861)
 The Police (Performance) Regulations 2008 (S.I. 2008/2862)
 The Police Appeals Tribunals Rules 2008 (S.I. 2008/2863)
 The Police (Conduct) Regulations 2008 (S.I. 2008/2864)
 The Police (Amendment) Regulations 2008 (S.I. 2008/2865)
 The Police (Complaints and Misconduct) (Amendment) Regulations 2008 (S.I. 2008/2866)
 The Local Government (Structural Changes) (Transitional Arrangements) (No.2) Regulations 2008 (S.I. 2008/2867)
 The National Health Service (Travel Expenses and Remission of Charges) Amendment (No. 2) Regulations 2008 (S.I. 2008/2868)
 The Political Donations and Regulated Transactions (Anonymous Electors) Regulations 2008 (S.I. 2008/2869)
 The Children and Adoption Act 2006 (Commencement No. 3) Order 2008 (S.I. 2008/2870)
 The Recovery of Taxes etc. Due in Other Member States (Amendment of Section 134 of the Finance Act 2002) Regulations 2008 (S.I. 2008/2871)
 The Land Registration Act 2002 (Amendment) Order 2008 (S.I. 2008/2872)
 The Education (Listed Bodies) (England) (Amendment) Order 2008 (S.I. 2008/2888)
 The Education (Recognised Bodies) (England) (Amendment) Order 2008 (S.I. 2008/2889)

2901-3000
 The Crossrail (Planning Appeals) (Written Representations Procedure) (England) Regulations 2008 (S.I. 2008/2908)
 The Local Authorities (England) (Charges for Property Searches) (Disapplication) Order 2008 (S.I. 2008/2909)
 The Merchant Shipping (Prevention of Air Pollution from Ships) Regulations 2008 (S.I. 2008/2924)
 The Council for Healthcare Regulatory Excellence (Appointment, Procedure etc.) Regulations 2008 (S.I. 2008/2927)
 The Social Security (Incapacity Benefit Work-focused Interviews) Regulations 2008 (S.I. 2008/2928)
 The Criminal Defence Service (Funding) (Amendment No. 2) Order 2008 (S.I. 2008/2930)
 The Wool Textile Industry (Export Promotion Levy) (Revocation) Order 2008 (S.I. 2008/2932)
 The Veterinary Surgeons and Veterinary Practitioners (Registration) (Amendment) Regulations Order of Council 2008 (S.I. 2008/2933)
 The High Court and County Courts Jurisdiction (Amendment) Order 2008 (S.I. 2008/2934)
 The Medical Devices (Amendment) Regulations 2008 (S.I. 2008/2936)
 The Case Tribunals (England) Regulations 2008 (S.I. 2008/2938)
 The Education (Student Support) (Amendment) (No. 3) Regulations 2008 (S.I. 2008/2939)
 The Children Act 1989 (Contact Activity Directions and Conditions: Financial Assistance) (England) Regulations 2008 (S.I. 2008/2940)
 The Armed Forces and Reserve Forces (Compensation Scheme) (Amendment No. 3) Order 2008 (S.I. 2008/2942)
 The Education (Special Educational Needs Co-ordinators) (England) Regulations 2008 (S.I. 2008/2945)
 The Medicines (Pharmacies) (Applications for Registration and Fees) Amendment Regulations 2008 (S.I. 2008/2946)
 The Judicial Pensions and Retirement Act 1993 (Addition of Qualifying Judicial Offices) (No.2) Order 2008 (S.I. 2008/2947)
 The Rail Vehicle Accessibility (London Underground Victoria Line 09TS Vehicles) Exemption Order 2008 (S.I. 2008/2969)
 The Rail Vehicle Accessibility Exemption Orders (Parliamentary Procedures) Regulations 2008 (S.I. 2008/2975)
 The Law Applicable to Non-Contractual Obligations (England and Wales and Northern Ireland) Regulations 2008 (S.I. 2008/2986)
 The Housing Benefit and Council Tax Benefit (Amendment) (No. 3) Regulations 2008 (S.I. 2008/2987)
 The Council of the City of Wakefield (Wakefield Waterfront Hepworth Gallery Footbridge) Scheme 2008 Confirmation Instrument 200 (S.I. 2008/2988)
 The Local Government Pension Scheme (Amendment) (No. 2) Regulations 2008 (S.I. 2008/2989)
 The Taxation of Pension Schemes (Transitional Provisions) (Amendment) Order 2008 (S.I. 2008/2990)
 The Taxes (Fees for Payment by Internet) Regulations 2008 (S.I. 2008/2991)
 The Rodbaston College, Cannock Chase Technical College and Tamworth and Lichfield College (Dissolution) Order 2008 (S.I. 2008/2992)
 The Criminal Justice and Immigration Act 2008 (Commencement No. 4 and Saving Provision) Order 2008 (S.I. 2008/2993)
 The Health and Social Care Act 2008 (Commencement No. 4) Order 2008 (S.I. 2008/2994)
 The Judicial Appointments Order 2008 (S.I. 2008/2995)
 The Companies (Particulars of Company Charges) Regulations 2008 (S.I. 2008/2996)
 The Pre-release Access to Official Statistics Order 2008 (S.I. 2008/2998)
 The Charges for Residues Surveillance (Amendment) Regulations 2008 (S.I. 2008/2999)
 The Companies Act 2006 (Annual Return and Service Addresses) Regulations 2008 (S.I. 2008/3000)

3001-3100
 The Legislative Reform (Lloyd's) Order 2008 (S.I. 2008/3001)
 The Housing and Regeneration Act 2008 (Consequential Provisions) Order 2008 (S.I. 2008/3002)
 The Local Loans (Increase of Limit) Order 2008 (S.I. 2008/3004)
 The Companies (Company Records) Regulations 2008 (S.I. 2008/3006)
 The Companies (Fees for Inspection of Company Records) Regulations 2008 (S.I. 2008/3007)
 The Race Relations Act 1976 (Amendment) Regulations 2008 (S.I. 2008/3008)
 The Crime (International Co-operation) Act 2003 (Commencement No. 4) Order 2008 (S.I. 2008/3009)
 The Mutual Recognition of Driving Disqualifications (Great Britain and Ireland) Regulations 2008 (S.I. 2008/3010)
 The Offshore Installations (Safety Zones) (No. 4) Order 2008 (S.I. 2008/3011)
 The Civil Contingencies Act 2004 (Amendment of List of Responders) Order 2008 (S.I. 2008/3012)
 The Removal, Storage and Disposal of Vehicles (Prescribed Sums and Charges) (Amendment) (England) Regulations 2008 (S.I. 2008/3013)
 The Companies (Registration) Regulations 2008 (S.I. 2008/3014)
 The Allocation of Housing (England)(Amendment)(Family Intervention Tenancies) Regulations 2008 (S.I. 2008/3015)
 The North Yorkshire County Council (School Meals) Order 2008 (S.I. 2008/3016)
 The Immigration and Nationality (Fees) (Amendment No. 3) Regulations 2008 (S.I. 2008/3017)
 The Excise Duties (Surcharges or Rebates) (Hydrocarbon Oils etc.) (Revocation) Order 2008 (S.I. 2008/3018)
 The Excise Duties (Road Fuel Gas) (Reliefs) (Revocation) Regulations 2008 (S.I. 2008/3019)
 The Value Added Tax (Change of Rate) Order 2008 (S.I. 2008/3020)
 The Value Added Tax (Amendment) (No 2) Regulations 2008 (S.I. 2008/3021)
 The Local Government (Structural Changes) (Finance) Regulations 2008 (S.I. 2008/3022)
 The Income Tax (Indexation) (No. 3) Order 2008 (S.I. 2008/3023)
 The Income Tax (Indexation) (No. 4) Order 2008 (S.I. 2008/3024)
 The Individual Savings Account (Amendment No. 3) Regulations 2008 (S.I. 2008/3025)
 The Alcoholic Liquor Duties (Surcharges) and Tobacco Products Duty Order 2008 (S.I. 2008/3026)
 The Electricity (Exemption from the Requirement for a Generation Licence) (Little Cheyne Court) (England and Wales) Order 2008 (S.I. 2008/3045)
 The Electricity (Exemption from the Requirement for a Generation Licence) (Gunfleet Sands II) (England and Wales) Order 2008 (S.I. 2008/3046)
 The General Chiropractic Council (Constitution) Order 2008 (S.I. 2008/3047)
 The Immigration (Biometric Registration) Regulations 2008 (S.I. 2008/3048)
 The Immigration (Biometric Registration) (Civil Penalty Code of Practice) Order 2008 (S.I. 2008/3049)
 The Safeguarding Vulnerable Groups Act 2006 (Prescribed Criteria) (Foreign Offences) Order 2008 (S.I. 2008/3050)
 The Social Security (Lone Parents and Miscellaneous Amendments) Regulations 2008 (S.I. 2008/3051)
 The Immigration (Designation of Travel Bans) (Amendment) Order 2008 (S.I. 2008/3052)
 The Definition of Financial Instrument Order 2008 (S.I. 2008/3053)
 The Education (Student Support) (European Institutions) (Amendment) (No. 2) Regulations 2008 (S.I. 2008/3054)
 The Employment Rights (Increase of Limits) Order 2008 (S.I. 2008/3055)
 The Travellers’ Allowances (Amendment) Order 2008 (S.I. 2008/3058)
 The Alcoholic Liquor (Surcharge on Spirits Duty) Order 2008 (S.I. 2008/3062)
 The Export Control (Iran) (Amendment) Order 2008 (S.I. 2008/3063)
 The Christmas Bonus (Relevant Week) Order 2008 (S.I. 2008/3064)
 The Domestic Violence, Crime and Victims Act 2004 (Commencement No. 10) Order 2008 (S.I. 2008/3065)
 The Antarctic (Amendment) Regulations 2008 (S.I. 2008/3066)
 The Human Tissue Act 2004 (Ethical Approval, Exceptions from Licensing and Supply of Information about Transplants) (Amendment) Regulations 2008(S.I. 2008/3067)
 The Housing and Regeneration Act 2008 (Commencement No. 2 and Transitional, Saving and Transitory Provisions) Order 2008 (S.I. 2008/3068)
 The Financial Assistance Scheme (Amendment) Regulations 2008 (S.I. 2008/3069)
 The Occupational Pensions (Revaluation) Order 2008 (S.I. 2008/3070)
 The Childcare (Provision of Information About Young Children) (England) (Amendment) Regulations 2008 (S.I. 2008/3071)
 The Education (Information About Individual Pupils) (England) (Amendment) Regulations 2008 (S.I. 2008/3072)
 The Takeover Code (Concert Parties) Regulations 2008 (S.I. 2008/3073)
 The Legal Services Act 2007 (Functions of a Designated Regulator) Order 2008 (S.I. 2008/3074)
 The Channel Tunnel Rail Link (Nomination) Order 2008 (S.I. 2008/3076)
 The Education and Skills Act 2008 (Commencement No. 1 and Savings) Order 2008 (S.I. 2008/3077)
 The Non-Domestic Rating Contributions (England) (Amendment) Regulations 2008 (S.I. 2008/3078)
 The National Child Measurement Programme Regulations 2008 (S.I. 2008/3080)
 The Education (National Curriculum) (Key Stage 3 Assessment Arrangements) (England) (Amendment) Order 2008 (S.I. 2008/3081)
 The Leeds City College (Incorporation) Order 2008 (S.I. 2008/3083)
 The Leeds City College (Government) Regulations 2008 (S.I. 2008/3084)
 The Civil Procedure (Amendment No.2) Rules 2008 (S.I. 2008/3085)
 The Education (School and Local Education Authority Performance Targets) (England) (Amendment) Regulations 2008 (S.I. 2008/3086)
 The Transfrontier Shipment of Radioactive Waste and Spent Fuel Regulations 2008 (S.I. 2008/3087)
 The School Admissions (Admission Arrangements) (England) Regulations 2008 (S.I. 2008/3089)
 The School Admissions (Co-ordination of Admission Arrangements) (England) Regulations 2008 (S.I. 2008/3090)
 The School Admissions (Local Authority Reports and Admission Forums) (England) Regulations 2008 (S.I. 2008/3091)
 The Education (Admissions Appeals Arrangements)(England)(Amendment) Regulations 2008 (S.I. 2008/3092)
 The School Information (England) Regulations 2008 (S.I. 2008/3093)
 The Parish Councils (Power to Promote Well-being) (Prescribed Conditions) Order 2008 (S.I. 2008/3095)
 The Insurance Companies (Corporation Tax Acts) (Amendment) (No. 2) Order 2008 (S.I. 2008/3096)
 The Medicines for Human Use (Marketing Authorisations Etc.) Amendment Regulations 2008 (S.I. 2008/3097)
 The National Savings Bank (Amendment) (No. 4) Regulations 2008 (S.I. 2008/3098)
 The Social Security (Contributions) (Amendment No.6) Regulations 2008 (S.I. 2008/3099)

3101-3200

 The European Parliamentary Elections (Appointed Day of Poll) Order 2008 (S.I. 2008/3102)
 The Parks for People (England) Joint Scheme (Authorisation) Order 2008 (S.I. 2008/3103)
 The Housing Renewal Grants (Amendment) (No. 2) (England) Regulations 2008 (S.I. 2008/3104)
 The Gambling (Operating Licence and Single-Machine Permit Fees) (Amendment) (No 2) Regulations 2008 (S.I. 2008/3105)
 The Family Proceedings Fees (Amendment No. 2) Order 2008 (S.I. 2008/3106)
 The Home Information Pack (Amendment) (No.3) Regulations 2008 (S.I. 2008/3107)
 The Health in Pregnancy Grant (Entitlement and Amount) Regulations 2008 (S.I. 2008/3108)
 The Health in Pregnancy Grant (Administration) Regulations 2008 (S.I. 2008/3109)
 The Local Government and Public Involvement in Health Act 2007 (Commencement No. 8) Order 2008 (S.I. 2008/3110)
 The Family Intervention Tenancies (Review of Local Authority Decisions) (England) Regulations 2008 (S.I. 2008/3111)
 The Local Authorities (Elected Mayors) (England) Regulations 2008 (S.I. 2008/3112)
 The General Optical Council (Committee Constitution) (Amendment) Rules Order of Council 2008 (S.I. 2008/3113)
 The Parliamentary Commissioner Order 2008 (S.I. 2008/3115)
 The European Communities (Definition of Treaties) (2006 International Tropical Timber Agreement) Order 2008 (S.I. 2008/3116)
 The European Communities (Designation) (No. 4) Order 2008 (S.I. 2008/3117)
 The Education (Inspectors of Education and Training in Wales) Order 2008 (S.I. 2008/3118)
 The Civil Aviation (Overseas Territories) (Gibraltar) (Revocations) Order 2008 (S.I. 2008/3119)
 The Civil Aviation (Overseas Territories) (Gibraltar) (Revocations) (No. 2) Order 2008 (S.I. 2008/3120)
 The Air Navigation (Guernsey) (Revocation) Order 2008 (S.I. 2008/3121)
 The Companies Act 2006 (Extension of Takeover Panel Provisions) (Isle of Man) Order 2008 (S.I. 2008/3122)
 The United Nations Arms Embargoes (Dependent Territories) (Amendment) Order 2008 (S.I. 2008/3123)
 The International Organization for Migration (Immunities and Privileges) Order 2008 (S.I. 2008/3124)
 The Air Navigation (Overseas Territories) (Amendment) Order 2008 (S.I. 2008/3125)
 The Inspectors of Education, Children's Services and Skills (No. 5) Order 2008 (S.I. 2008/3126)
 The Cayman Islands (Constitution) (Amendment) Order 2008 (S.I. 2008/3127)
 The United Nations Arms Embargoes (Rwanda) (Amendment) Order 2008 (S.I. 2008/3128)
 The Naval Medical Compassionate Fund Order 2008 (S.I. 2008/3129)
 The Misuse of Drugs Act 1971 (Amendment) Order 2008 (S.I. 2008/3130)
 The Medical Profession (Miscellaneous Amendments) Order 2008 (S.I. 2008/3131)
 The National Assembly for Wales (Legislative Competence) (Social Welfare and Other Fields) Order 2008 (S.I. 2008/3132)
 The Air Navigation (Environmental Standards For Non-EASA Aircraft) Order 2008 (S.I. 2008/3133)
 The Transfer of Functions (Administration of Rent Officer Service in England) Order 2008 (S.I. 2008/3134)
 The International Criminal Court (Remand Time) Order 2008 (S.I. 2008/3135)
 The UK Borders Act 2007 (Commencement No. 5) Order 2008 (S.I. 2008/3136)
 The Health and Social Care Act 2008 (Commencement No. 5) Order 2008 (S.I. 2008/3137)
 The Judicial Pensions and Retirement Act 1993 (Addition of Qualifying Judicial Offices) (No. 3) Order 2008 (S.I. 2008/3139)
 The Social Security (Child Benefit Disregard) Regulations 2008 (S.I. 2008/3140)
 The Merchant Shipping (Vessel Traffic Monitoring and Reporting Requirements) (Amendment) Regulations 2008 (S.I. 2008/3145)
 The Police and Criminal Evidence Act 1984 (Codes of Practice) (Revisions to Code A) (No. 2) Order 2008 (S.I. 2008/3146)
 The Designation of Schools having a Religious Character (England) (No. 2) Order 2008 (S.I. 2008/3147)
 The Nursing and Midwifery Council (Midwifery and Practice Committees) (Constitution) Rules Order of Council 2008 (S.I. 2008/3148)
 The Legal Services Act 2007 (Commencement No. 3 and Transitory Provisions) Order 2008 (S.I. 2008/3149)
 The Health Care and Associated Professions (Miscellaneous Amendments) Order 2008 (Commencement No. 2) Order of Council 2008 (S.I. 2008/3150)
 The Tax Credits Act 2002 (Transitional Provisions) Order 2008 (S.I. 2008/3151)
 The Youth Justice Board for England and Wales (Amendment) Order 2008 (S.I. 2008/3155)
 The Rent Officers (Housing Benefit Functions) Amendment (No. 2) Order 2008 (S.I. 2008/3156)
 The Social Security (Miscellaneous Amendments) (No. 7) Regulations 2008 (S.I. 2008/3157)
 The UK Borders Act 2007 (Code of Practice on Children) Order 2008 (S.I. 2008/3158)
 The Authorised Investment Funds (Tax) (Amendment No. 3) Regulations 2008 (S.I. 2008/3159)
 The Civil Enforcement of Parking Contraventions (St. Helens) Designation Order 2008 (S.I. 2008/3160)
 The Export of Goods, Transfer of Technology and Provision of Technical Assistance (Control) (Amendment) (No. 2) Order 2008 (S.I. 2008/3161)
 The Intestate Succession (Interest and Capitalisation) (Amendment) Order 2008 (S.I. 2008/3162)
 The Network Rail (Thameslink) (Land Acquisition) Order 2008 (S.I. 2008/3163)
 The Road Safety Act 2006 (Commencement No. 5) Order 2008 (S.I. 2008/3164)
 The Finance Act 2008, Section 31 (Specified Tax Year) Order 2008 (S.I. 2008/3165)
 The Mental Health Act 1983 (Independent Mental Health Advocates) (England) Regulations 2008 (S.I. 2008/3166)
 The Welfare Reform Act 2007 (Commencement No. 9) Order 2008 (S.I. 2008/3167)
 The Health and Social Care Act 2008 (Commencement No.6, Transitory and Transitional Provisions) Order 2008 (S.I. 2008/3168)
 The Air Navigation (Restriction of Flying) (Nuclear Installations) (Amendment) Regulations 2008 (S.I. 2008/3169)
 The Wireless Telegraphy (Licence Award) (Cardiff) Regulations 2008 (S.I. 2008/3190)
 The Wireless Telegraphy (Licence Award) (Manchester) Regulations 2008 (S.I. 2008/3191)
 The Wireless Telegraphy (Spectrum Trading) (Amendment) (No. 3) Regulations 2008 (S.I. 2008/3192)
 The Wireless Telegraphy (Register) (Amendment) (No. 3) Regulations 2008 (S.I. 2008/3193)
 The Social Security (Housing Costs Special Arrangements) (Amendment and Modification) Regulations 2008 (S.I. 2008/3195)
 The Zoonoses and Animal By-Products (Fees) (England) (No. 2) Regulations 2008 (S.I. 2008/3196)
 The Wireless Telegraphy (Limitation of Number of Spectrum Access Licences) (No. 2) Order 2008 (S.I. 2008/3197)
 The Civil Enforcement of Parking Contraventions (County of Cheshire) (City of Chester and Borough of Ellesmere Port & Neston) Designation Order 2008 (S.I. 2008/3198)
 The A65 Trunk Road (From M6 Junction 36 to the Roundabout Junction with the A59) (Detrunking) Order 2008 (S.I. 2008/3199)

3201-3300

 The Land Registration (Proper Office) Order 2008 (S.I. 2008/3201)
 The Town and Country Planning (Trees) (Amendment No. 2) (England) Regulations 2008 (S.I. 2008/3202)
 The Animals and Animal Products (Import and Export) (England) (Amendment) Regulations 2008 (S.I. 2008/3203)
 The Safeguarding Vulnerable Groups Act 2006 (Commencement No. 1) (England) Order 2008 (S.I. 2008/3204)
 The Spirit Drinks Regulations 2008 (S.I. 2008/3206)
 The Companies (Model Articles) Regulations 2008 (S.I. 2008/3229)
 The Products of Animal Origin (Third Country Imports) (England) (Amendment) Regulations 2008 (S.I. 2008/3230)
 The Export Control Order 2008 (S.I. 2008/3231)
 The Employment Act 2008 (Commencement No. 1, Transitional Provisions and Savings) Order 2008 (S.I. 2008/3232)
 The Plant Health (Import Inspection Fees) (England) (Amendment) Regulations 2008 (S.I. 2008/3233)
 The Taxes and Duties (Interest Rate) (Amendment) Regulations 2008 (S.I. 2008/3234)
 The Stamp Duty and Stamp Duty Reserve Tax (Investment Exchanges and Clearing Houses) Regulations (No. 2) 2008 (S.I. 2008/3235)
 The Stamp Duty Reserve Tax (Amendment of section 89AA of the Finance Act 1986) Regulations 2008 (S.I. 2008/3236)
 The Loan Relationships and Derivative Contracts (Change of Accounting Practice) (Amendment) Regulations 2008 (S.I. 2008/3237)
 The General Dental Council (Constitution) (Amendment) Order of Council 2008 (S.I. 2008/3238)
 The Employment Tribunals (Constitution and Rules of Procedure) (Amendment) Regulations 2008 (S.I. 2008/3240)
 The Pensions Act 2008 (Commencement No. 1 and Consequential Provision) Order 2008 (S.I. 2008/3241)
 The Fines Collection (Disclosure of Information) (Prescribed Benefits) Regulations 2008 (S.I. 2008/3242)
 The Financial Assistance for Environmental Purposes (England and Wales) Order 2008 (S.I. 2008/3243)
 The Health and Social Care Act 2008 (Commencement No. 7) Order 2008 (S.I. 2008/3244)
 The Local Government Pension Scheme (Administration) (Amendment) Regulations 2008 (S.I. 2008/3245)
 The Child Benefit (Rates) (Amendment) Regulations 2008 (S.I. 2008/3246)
 The Rates of Child Benefit (Commencement) Order 2008 (S.I. 2008/3247)
 The Local Authorities (England) (Charges for Property Searches) Regulations 2008 (S.I. 2008/3248)
 The Bradford &amp; Bingley plc Compensation Scheme Order 2008 (S.I. 2008/3249)
 The Kaupthing Singer &amp; Friedlander Limited (Determination of Compensation) Order 2008 (S.I. 2008/3250)
 The Heritable Bank plc (Determination of Compensation) Order 2008 (S.I. 2008/3251)
 The Beef and Veal Labelling Regulations 2008 (S.I. 2008/3252)
 The Education (Independent School Standards) (England) (Amendment) Regulations 2008 (S.I. 2008/3253)
 The Christmas Bonus (Specified Sum) Order 2008 (S.I. 2008/3255)
 The General Teaching Council for England (Disciplinary Functions) (Amendment) Regulations 2008 (S.I. 2008/3256)
 The Merchant Shipping (Prevention of Pollution by Sewage and Garbage from Ships) Regulations 2008 (S.I. 2008/3257)
 The Health Service Branded Medicines (Control of Prices and Supply of Information) (No. 2) Regulations 2008 (S.I. 2008/3258)
 The Rehabilitation of Offenders Act 1974 (Exceptions) (Amendment) (England and Wales) Order 2008 (S.I. 2008/3259)
 The Criminal Justice and Immigration Act 2008 (Commencement No. 5) Order 2008 (S.I. 2008/3260)
 The Overview and Scrutiny (Reference by Councillors) (Excluded Matters) (England) Order 2008 (S.I. 2008/3261)
 The Legislative Reform (Verification of Weighing and Measuring Equipment) Order 2008 (S.I. 2008/3262)
 The Severn Bridges Tolls Order 2008 (S.I. 2008/3263)
 The Council Tax and Non-Domestic Rating (Demand Notices) (England) (Amendment) (No. 2) Regulations 2008 (S.I. 2008/3264)
 The Safeguarding Vulnerable Groups Act 2006 (Prescribed Information) Regulations 2008 (S.I. 2008/3265)
 The Charities Act 2006 (Commencement No. 5, Transitional and Transitory Provisions and Savings) Order 2008 (S.I. 2008/3267)
 The Charities Act 1993 (Exception from Registration) Regulations 2008 (S.I. 2008/3268)
 The Criminal Procedure (Amendment No. 2) Rules 2008 (S.I. 2008/3269)
 The Employment and Support Allowance (Up-rating Modification) (Transitional) Regulations 2008 (S.I. 2008/3270)
 The A38 Trunk Road (Weeford, Staffordshire to Minworth, Birmingham) (Detrunking) Order 2008 (S.I. 2008/3291)
 The A38 Trunk Road (Langley Mill, Warwickshire/Birmingham) (Detrunking) Order 2008 (S.I. 2008/3292)
 The Armed Forces (Alignment of Service Discipline Acts) (No. 2) Order 2008 (S.I. 2008/3294)
 The Transmissible Spongiform Encephalopathies (England) (Amendment) Regulations 2008 (S.I. 2008/3295)
 The Counter-Terrorism Act 2008 (Commencement No. 1) Order 2008 (S.I. 2008/3296)
 The Penalties for Disorderly Behaviour (Amount of Penalty) (Amendment) Order 2008 (S.I. 2008/3297)
 The Kent County Council (Milton Creek Bridge) (No. 2) Scheme 2007 Confirmation Instrument 2008 (S.I. 2008/3298)

3301-3400

 The Knowsley Metropolitan Borough Council (M62 Motorway, Junction 6 Improvements) Scheme 2008 Confirmation Instrument 2008 (S.I. 2008/3325)
 The Civil Procedure (Amendment No.3) Rules 2008 (S.I. 2008/3327)

External links
Legislation.gov.uk delivered by the UK National Archive
UK SI's on legislation.gov.uk
UK Draft SI's on legislation.gov.uk

See also
List of Statutory Instruments of the United Kingdom

Lists of Statutory Instruments of the United Kingdom
Statutory Instruments